= Pabna Medical College =

Government medical school in Bangladesh

- পাবনা মেডিকেল কলেজ
- Type: Public medical school
- Established: 2008
- Academic affiliations: Rajshahi Medical University
- Principal: Dr. Muhammad Ruhul Kuddus
- Students: 292
- Location: Pabna, Rajshahi, Bangladesh; 24.0046°N 89.2090°E
- Campus: Urban
- Language: English
- Website: pmc.edu.bd

Pabna Medical College (PMC) (Bengali: পাবনা মেডিকেল কলেজ) is a medical school in Bangladesh, established in 2008. It is located in Hemayetpur, in the western part of Pabna. It is affiliated with Rajshahi Medical University.

It offers a five-year medical education course leading to an MBBS degree. A one-year internship after graduation is compulsory for all graduates. The degree is recognized by the Bangladesh Medical and Dental Council.

The college is associated with 250-bed Pabna General Hospital. Pabna Medical College Journal is the official journal of the college.

== History ==
The government of Bangladesh established Pabna Medical College in 2008. Instruction began in two abandoned buildings of Pabna Mental Hospital in November of that year. A number of other disused buildings were repurposed as student hostels. Pending construction of a medical college hospital, practical instruction took place at Pabna General Hospital, 5 kilometres (3.1 mi) away.

The health department transferred 33 acres of the mental hospital site to the college. There construction of a new six-storey building began in 2009 at a cost of 870 million taka ($11 million in 2013). then PM Sheikh Hasina opened the building in January 2013.

In June 2014, students boycotted classes and barricaded Principal Mohammed Ali in his office for hours to protest against a shortage of teachers; for opening of a library; for transport services to and from Pabna General Hospital; and for adequate security in student housing. Although the principal had in March requested from the Directorate General of Health Services the appointment of 30 lecturers on an emergency basis, according to students, there were as yet no teachers of physiology, pathology, microbiology, radiology and imaging, or otorhinolaryngology, and there remained a shortage of teachers of other subjects.

Students at the college demonstrated in 2015, calling for the reinstatement of the "carry on" examination system. The Bachelor of Medicine, Bachelor of Surgery (MBBS) degree programme is divided into four parts by the first, second, and third professional examinations. If a student fails one of these exams, they may sit it again six months later. Under the 2002 "carry on" system, students could continue taking classes in the next academic session while preparing to retake an exam. This system was strongly favored by medical students, but strongly opposed by their teachers. The Bangladesh Medical and Dental Council eliminated "carry on" in 2013, after which students who failed a professional exam were not allowed to continue classes until they had passed it, causing them to lose up to a year in the process.

On 28 September 2023, President Mohammed Shahabuddin laid the foundation stone for a 500-bed Pabna Medical College Hospital on the college premises.

== Campus ==
The college is located opposite Pabna Mental Hospital on a dirt road in Hemayetpur, in the western part of Pabna. The 33-acre campus contains a six-story academic building, a two-storied hostel for male students, and a three-storied hostel for the female students. As of 2024, a college hospital is under construction.

== Organization and administration ==
The college has been affiliated with Rajshahi Medical University since 2017. Before that it was affiliated with University of Rajshahi. The principal of the college is Dr. Ruhul Quddus.

== Academics ==
The college offers a five-year course of studies, approved by the Bangladesh Medical and Dental Council (BMDC), leading to a Bachelor of Medicine, Bachelor of Surgery (MBBS) degree from Rajshahi Medical University. After passing the final professional examination, there is a compulsory one-year internship. The internship is a prerequisite for obtaining registration from the BMDC to practice medicine.

Admission for Bangladeshis to the MBBS course at all medical colleges in Bangladesh is controlled centrally by the Directorate General of Health Services (DGHS). It administers an annual, written, multiple choice question admission exam simultaneously across the country. It sets prerequisites for who can take the exam, and sets a minimum pass level. DGHS has varied the admission rules over the years, but historically candidates have been admitted based primarily on their score on this test. Grades at the Secondary School Certificate (SSC) and Higher Secondary School Certificate (HSC) level have also been a factor, as part of a combined score or as a prerequisite for taking the exam. DGHS also admits candidates to fill quotas: freedom fighters' descendants, tribal, foreign, and others. Admission for foreign students is based on their SSC and HSC grades. As of 2021, the college is allowed to admit 70 students annually.

Pabna Medical College Journal is the official journal of the college.

== See also ==
- List of medical colleges in Bangladesh
