= Selina Banu =

Bangladeshi politician

- Born: 12 October 1926
- Died: 26 January 1983 (aged 56)
- Occupations: Politician, social activist

Selina Banu (Bengali: সেলিনা বানু; 12 October 1926 – 26 January 1983) was a Bangladeshi politician, social activist, and feminist.

== Early life ==
Banu was born in Pabna, Pabna District, East Bengal, British Raj. Her father Washim Uddin Ahmad was a member of the Bengal Legislative Council. She joined the Communist Study Group. She graduated from Pabna Girls' School in 1943 and from Pabna Edward College in 1945. She finished her master's degree from Pabna Edward College in 1949. She graduated from Dhaka Teacher's Training College in 1961. She worked in food and shelter houses managed by the women's Self-defence Association during the 1943 Bengal Famine.

== Career ==
Banu joined Pabna Government Girls' School as a teacher. She joined Awami League in 1953 and was elected Women Secretary to the provincial committee. She was elected to the East Pakistan Provincial Assembly next year from the United Front. She was nominated whip by Awami League. She criticised the police treatment of Ila Mitra and asked for and to her detention. She was elected to the Central Committee of the National Awami Party. She would later work as a teacher in Rangpur Government Girls' School and from 1959 to 1964 in Nari Sikkhsa Mondir. She was the headmistress of Pabna Central Girls' School.

Banu joined Farida Bidyatan school as the headmistress in 1964. She joined the Moscow aligned fraction of the National Awami Party in 1967. After Dr. Mohammad Shamsuzzoha was killed in Rajshahi University, she presided over a protest in Comilla in 1969. During the Bangladesh Liberation War she worked in the refugee camps in Salt Lake city and Agartala. Her daughter, Shirin Banu, fought in the Bangladesh Liberation war dressed as a man.

== Death ==
Banu died at age 56.
