= Pabna =

City in Bangladesh

Pabna পাবনা
- City
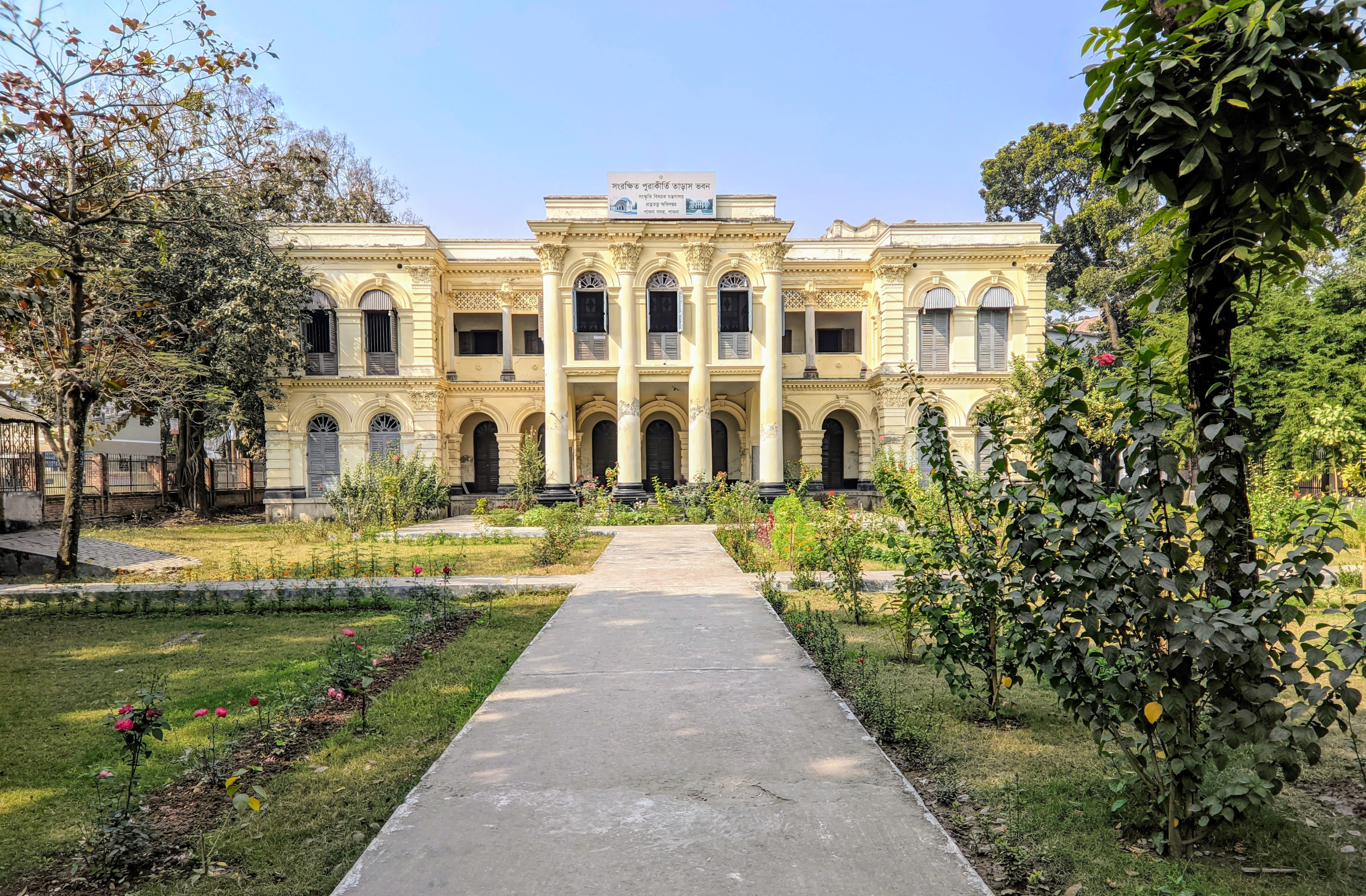
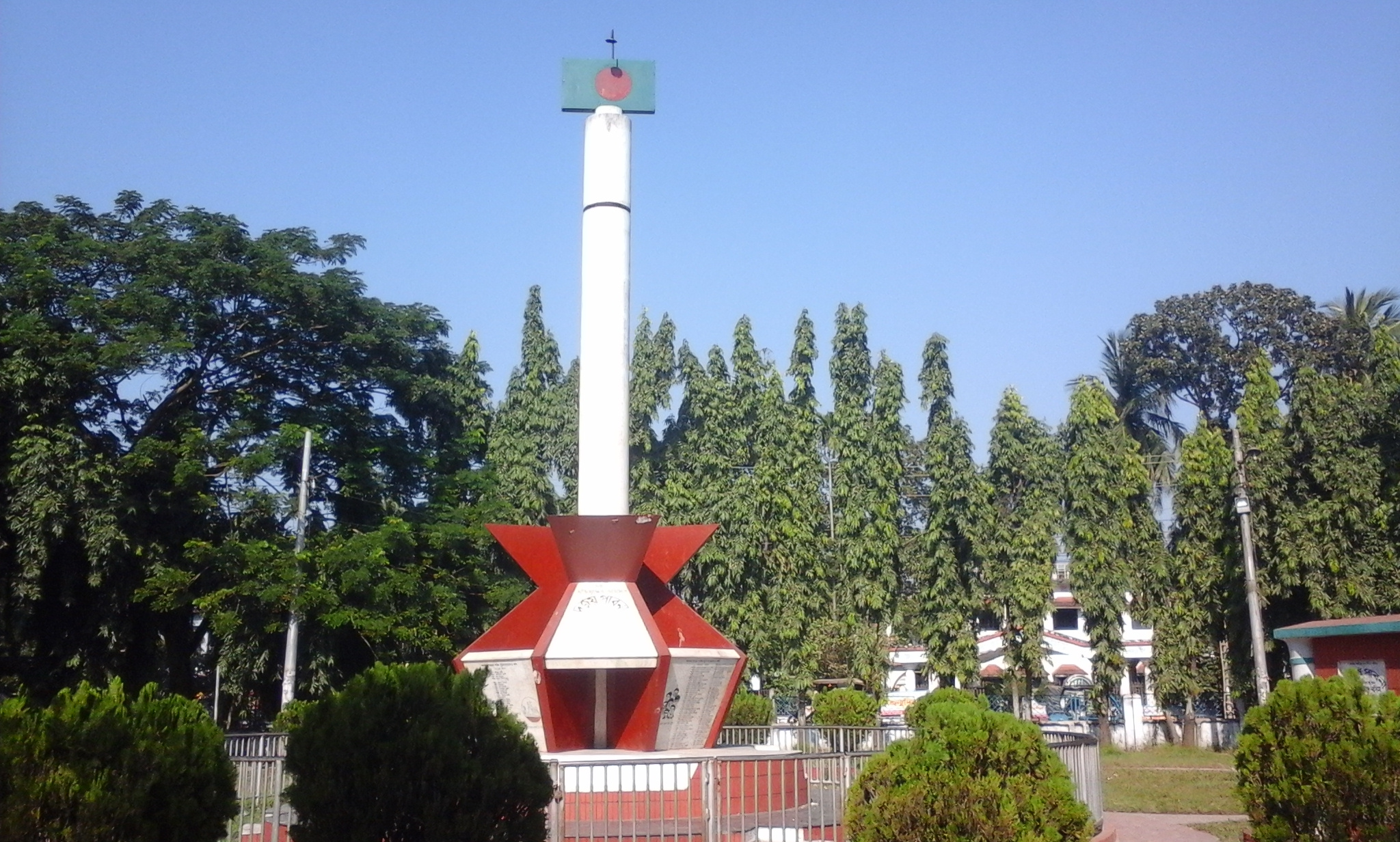
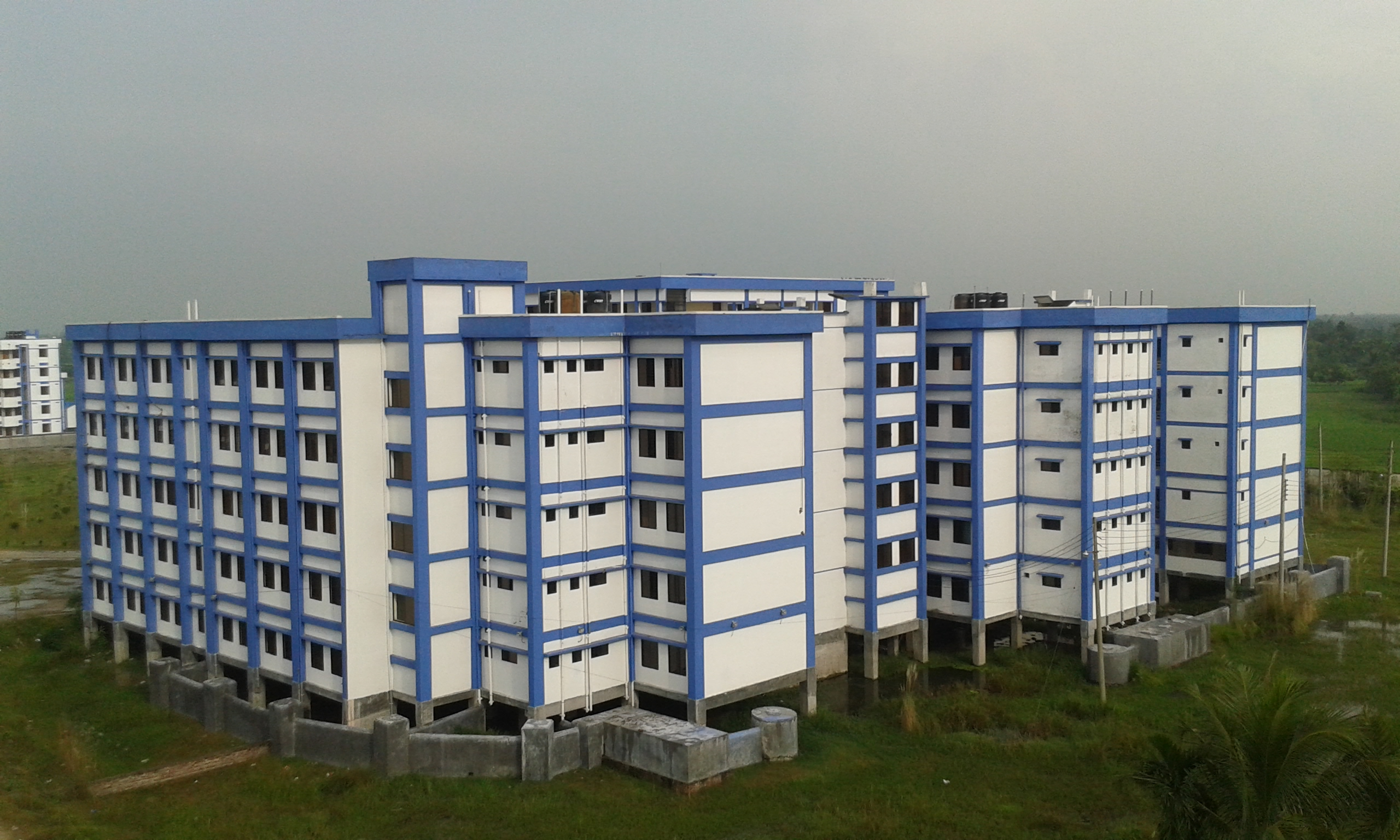
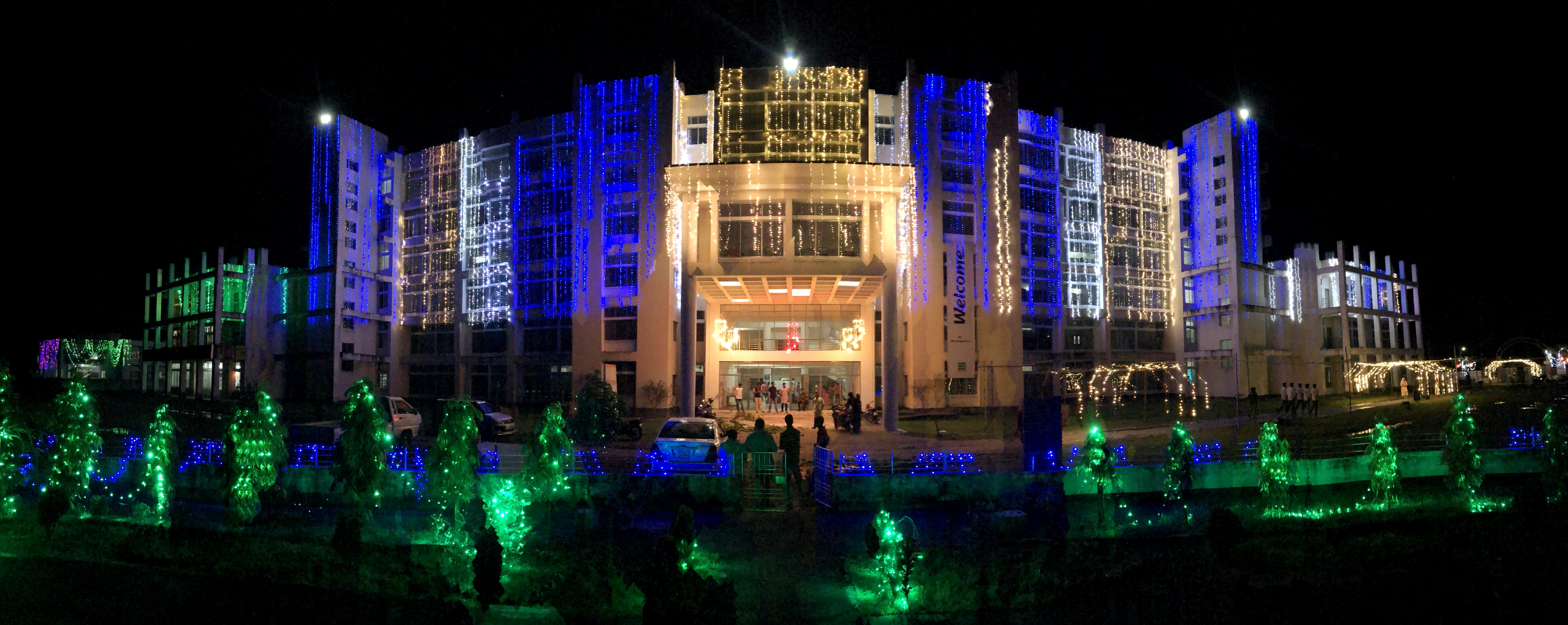
- Clockwise: Tarash Palace, Pabna University of Science & Technology campus, Pabna Medical College, Durjoy Jagoron Memorial

- Location within Bangladesh Rajshahi division Location within Bangladesh
- Coordinates: 24°00′28″N 89°14′20″E
- Country: Bangladesh
- Division: Rajshahi Division
- District: Pabna District
- Upazila: Pabna Sadar Upazila

Government
  - Type: Municipality
  - Mayor: vacant

Area
  - Total: 27.43 km^{2} (10.59 sq mi)
  - Land: 22.23 km^{2} (8.58 sq mi)
  - Water: 5.20 km^{2} (2.01 sq mi)
- Elevation: 16 m (52 ft)

Population (2022)
  - Total: 175,982
  - Density: 7,916/km^{2} (20,500/sq mi)
- Time zone: UTC+6 (BST)
- Website: pabna.gov.bd

Pabna (Bengali: পাবনা) is a city on the north bank of the Padma river in the Rajshahi Division. It is the headquarters of the Pabna District and the Pabna Sadar Upazila. According to the 2022 Bangladeshi census the population of Pabna City is 176,000, which makes it the 30th largest city in Bangladesh.

== Etymology ==
- According to the historian Radharaman Saha, Pabna is named after Paboni, a branch of the Ganges (Originated from Himalayan).
- Archeologist Alexander Cunningham theorized that the name came from the name of the ancient kingdom Pundra or Pundravardhana.
- Haraprasad Shastri, the author and historian, regarded the name Pabna as originating from Podubomba, a small feudal kingdom, which was established by a king named Shom, during the Pal Dynasty period.
- Historian Durgadas Lahiri, in his book Prithibir Itihash, used a map from the ancient period where a village named Pabna can be seen.
- Historian Syed Murtaza Ali wrote that Pabna took its name from a robber named Pobna.

== Administration ==
Pabna city ia administered by a pourashava named Pabna Municipality, which consists of a mayor and 15 councillors and five female councillors. Each councillor represents a ward of the town. All of them are elected by people's vote.

== Demographics ==
Religions in Pabna Paurashava (2022)
Religion	Percent
Islam	94.78%
Hinduism	5.02%
Other or not stated	0.16%

According to the 2022 Bangladesh census, Pabna city had 44,685 households and a population of 176,005. Pabna had a literacy rate of 72.74%: 72.76% for males and 72.72% for females, and a sex ratio of 104.69 males per 100 females. 7.17% of the population was under 5 years of age.

According to the 2011 Bangladesh census, Pabna city had 33,217 households and a population of 144,442. 24,391 (16.89%) were under 10 years of age. Pabna had a literacy rate (age 7 and over) of 76.22%, compared to the national average of 51.8%, and a sex ratio of 951 females per 1000 males.

== Transport ==
Dhaka is about five hours by road, through the Jamuna Bridge. Cities and towns of Dhaka Division, Chittagong Division and Sylhet Division are connected through it. Kushtia District and other parts of Khulna Division and Barisal Division is connected through Lalon Shah Bridge.

=== Waterway ===
Water transport is important, as the Padma and other rivers, and Chalan Beel wetland are in Pabna.

River crossings (ferry ghaat) at Nagarbari on the Jamuna River is the old route to Dhaka and the eastern part of Bangladesh. It took three to four hours to cross only the Jamuna from Nagarbari to Aricha river port in Manikgonj District. Nowadays, the ferry terminal as well as launch terminal shifted from Nagarbari to Kazirhat. It takes approximately 1 hour to cross Jamuna River through ferry from Kazirhat to Aricha Port. There are several ferry and launch services in operation from Kazirhat to Aricha. Najirganj river crossing on the Padma River connects Pabna city with neighbouring Rajbari District as well as Faridpur, Madaripur, Shariatpur and Gopalganj, and Barisal Division.

=== Railway ===
Pabna city has connected with a new railway network. Pabna Railway Station is in Shalgaria near Pabna Central Bus Terminal, opened on 14 July 2018. A nearby railway station was in Tebunia, 10 kilometres (6.2 mi) from the city center.

=== Airway ===
Ishwardi Airport serves Pabna City. But the airport is non-operational due to lack of passenger demand. Biman Bangladesh Airlines used to operate twice-weekly services to Ishwardi from Hazrat Shahjalal International Airport, Dhaka. However, no airlines are operating to and from Ishwardi at the moment. The nearest operation airport is Shah Makhdum Airport in Rajshahi which is more than 90 km away from city centre.

=== Others ===
Several Dhaka-bound private bus services are available such as Pabna Express, Shyamoli, Sarkar Travels, Raja Badsha, Badol, Mohanagar, C-line, Arif, Ishurdi Express, Night Star, Kings, Esha, Capital Service, Al-Hamra, Silver Line, etc. Government-owned Bangladesh Road Transport Corporation (BRTC) provides bus services to Rajshahi and Bogra city.

In Pabna district, rides by Nosimon, rickshaw-van, and Korimon are also available.

== Industry ==
Pabna has fledgeling knitted fabric and handloom related textile industries. There are consumer and pharmaceutical producing factories. Square Pharmaceuticals is the largest pharmaceutical company in Bangladesh. A majority of its factories are at Shalgaria near Jubilee Tank area of the town.

=== Notable industries ===
- Square Pharmaceuticals, Square Road, Shalgaria, Pabna
- Square Toiletries, Meril Road, Shalgaria
- Square Food and Beverages, Meril Road, Shalgaria
- Akij Jute Mills Ltd., Ataikula
- Edruc Limited, Arifpur
- Shyamoli Foods Ltd, Shalgaria
- Bengal Meat
- Shamim Flower Mills, Radhanagor
- Ms. Gani & Brothers, Kalachandpara
- Intra Foods, Balarampur
- Ms. Shapla Plastics Ltd., BSCIC I/A
- Seven Star Fish Processing Company Ltd., near Central bus terminal, Laskarpur
- Universal Foods Ltd., Dilalpur
- Apan Store, Hazir hat, Pabna Sadar.
- Nuclear Power Plant, Ruppur, Ishwardi, Pabna.

== Education ==
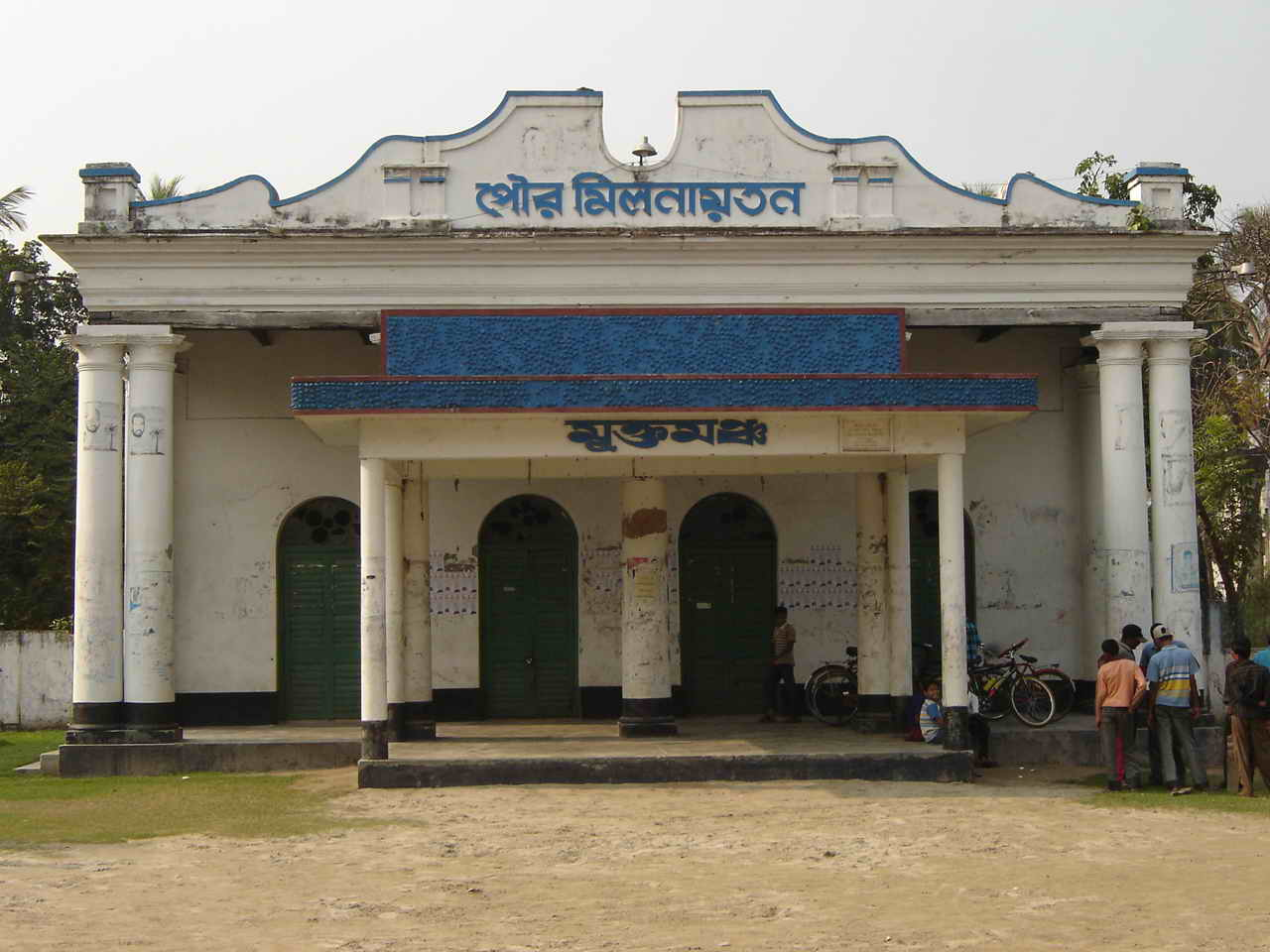
Old Mukto Moncho (open auditorium) 2007

The only University in this City is Pabna University of Science and Technology. There are several higher and secondary education institutions such as:

- Govt. Edward College, Pabna
- Radhanagar Majumder Academy, Pabna
- Govt. Shaheed Bulbul College
- Government Women's College, Pabna
- Govt. Technical School and College, Pabna
- North Point School & College, Pabna
- Imam Ghazzali Girls' School and College
- Pabna College
- Pabna Cadet College
- Pabna Islamia College
- Pabna Medical College
- Pabna Polytechnic Institute
- Pabna Zilla School
- Pabna Government Girls' School
- Pabna Central Girls' School
- Pabna Islamia Madrasha
- Shaheed M. Munsur Ali College
- Textile Engineering College, Pabna.
- Al-Hera Academy School & College, Bera
- Debuttor Kabi Bande Ali Mia High School
- Galaxy School & College, Bera-Pabna
- Masundia Bhawanipur Degree College
- Masundia Bhawanipur High School
- Chatmohar Pilot Girls' High School, Chatmohar
- Govt. RCN & BSN Model High School & College, Chatmohar
- Chatmohar Govt. College, Chatmohar
- Chatmohar Women's College, Chatmohar
- Saint Rita's High School, Chatmohar

== Health ==
Pabna has the largest mental hospital in Bangladesh. It also has a big general hospital, numerous medical centres, and small private clinics. Pabna Medical College and Hospital was established in 2008.

In healthcare, Pabna Community Clinic, a division of Dhaka Community Clinic, established and led by Professor Dr. Quazi Qumruzzaman, has made a great contribution in development and mitigation of arsenicosis. The nine upazilas under Pabna District holds an upazila health complex each. Government doctors get appointment through Bangladesh Civil Service commission.

A 250-bed government-owned general hospital is at Shaalgaariya and a 450-bed mental hospital is at Hemayetpur. Recently the government-owned Pabna Medical College has been set up near the mental hospital, Pabna premise.

== Culture ==
There is a mosque at Chatmohar Upzilla named Shahi Mosque which was built by Masum Khan kabuli in the 15th century.

A Mughal-era mosque 'Varara Moshjid' (Bengali: ভাঁড়াড়া মসজিদ) is some 10 km southeast of the city. There is a rumour that the mosque was built in one night.

The remains of a Hindu temple named Jor Bangla (recently renovated) is in Jor Baangla Paara of the city. Jagannath Temple at Chatmohar Upazila is considered one of the most beautiful Hindu temples in northern Bangladesh.

== Notable residents ==
- Rassundari Devi, a Bengali writer who is identified as the author of the first full-fledged autobiography in modern Bengali literature.
- Sarder Jayenuddin, novelist
- Air Vice Marshal (Rtd.) A. K. Khandker, first Chief of Staff of Bangladesh Air Force (1971–1975), Former Minister, Ministry Planning of People's Republic of Bangladesh
- Mirza Abdul Halim, State minister, Ministry of Shipping
- Mirza Abdul Awal, Founded chairman of Pabna district section of BNP
- Zia Haider, writer
- Amiya Bhushan Majumdar, Indian novelist
- Mohammed Shahabuddin Chuppu, jurist and politician, President of Bangladesh
- Amjad Hossain, MNA, (Member of National Assembly of Pakistan)
- Bonde Ali Miah, poet
- Group Captain (Rtd.) Saiful Azam, former pilot, a war hero of 1965 Indo-Pakistani War and 1967 Arab-Israeli War (Six-Day War)
- General Joyanto Nath Chaudhuri OBE, Indian Army Officer and former Chief of Army Staff of the Indian Army.
- Pramatha Chaudhuri, writer
- Samson H. Chowdhury, businessman, former chairman of Square Group
- Thakur Anukulchandra, guru, Indian physician and founder of Satsang Ashram
- Mohammed Fazle Rabbee, cardiologist, intellectual, murdered in the intellectual killing during the 1971 genocide in Bangladesh by Pakistani army and its local collaborators
- A. B. Mirza Azizul Islam, advisor
- Pramatha Chaudhuri, writer
- Daud Haider, poet
- Rashid Haider, writer
- Makid Haider, writer
- Kamal Ahmed, singer, administrator
