= Pabna District =

Pabna District পাবনা জেলা
- District of Bangladesh
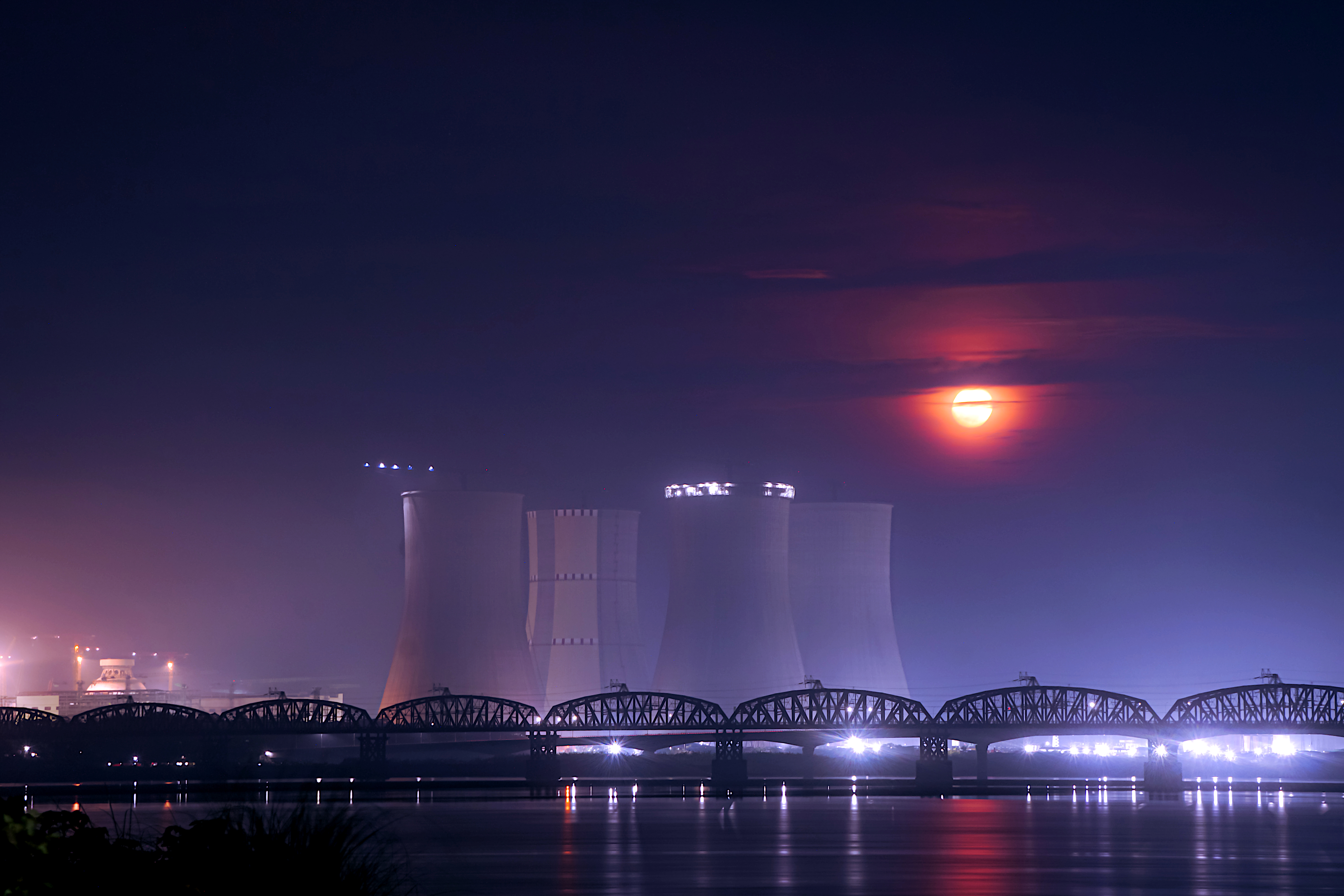
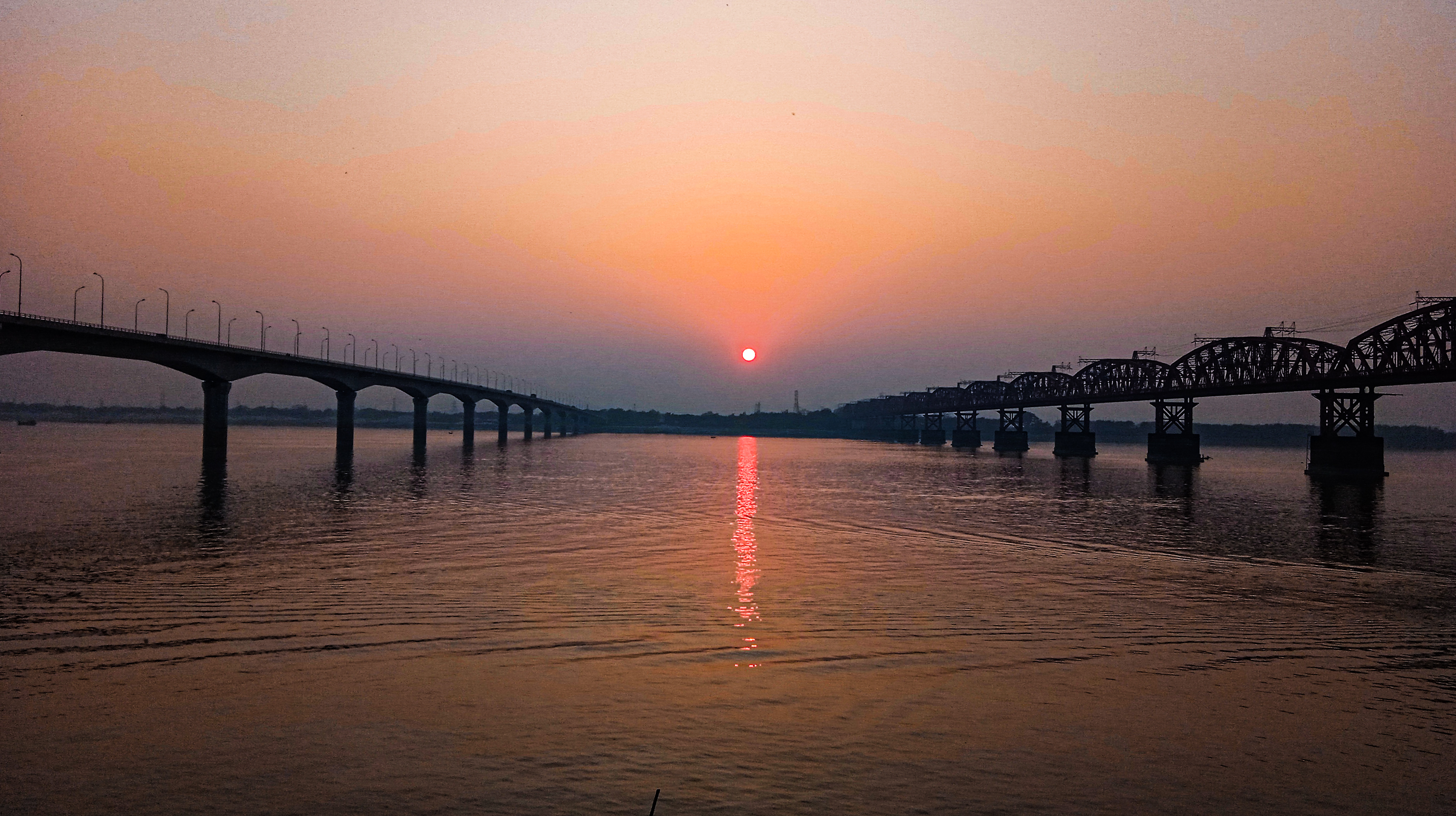
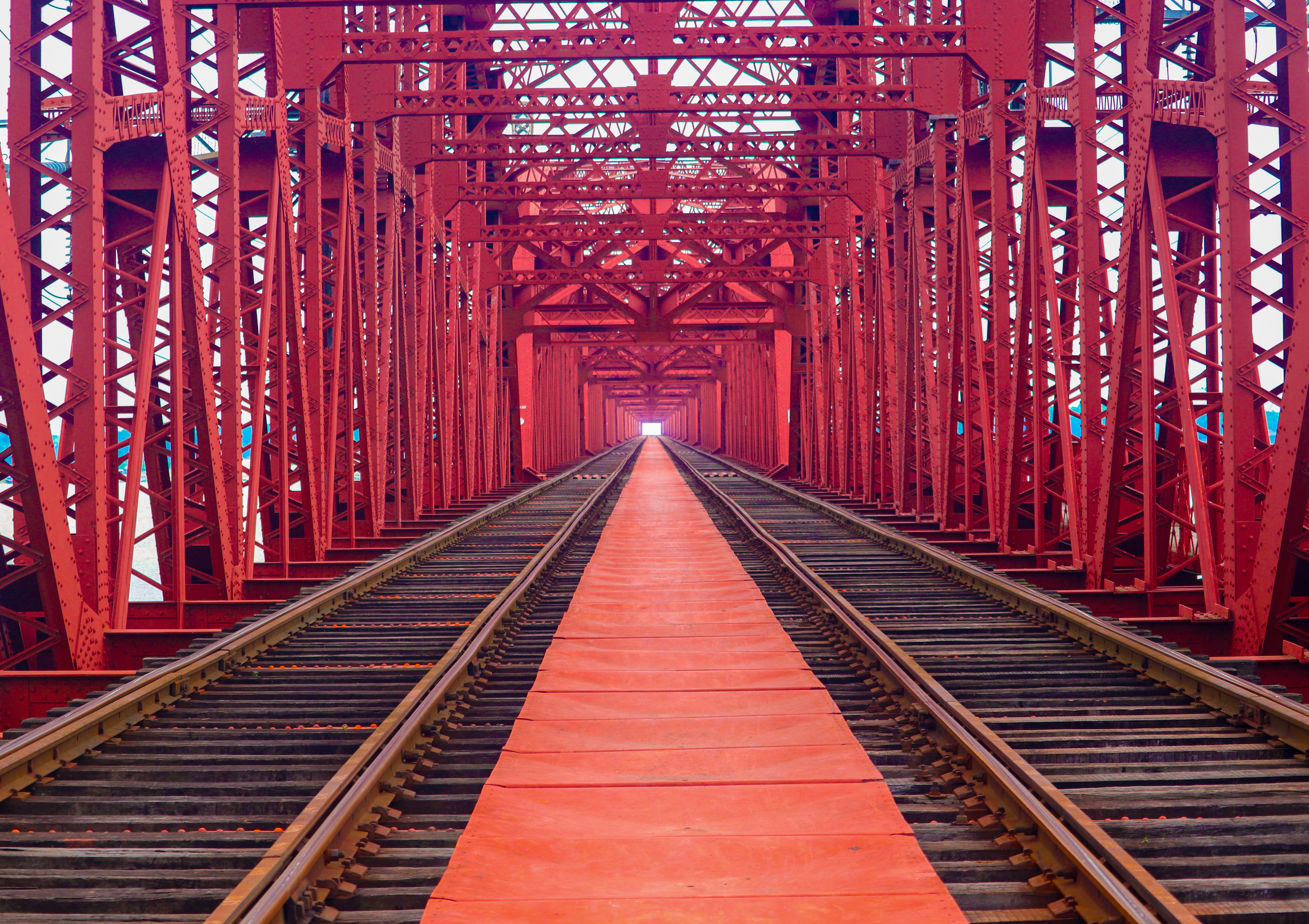
- From top: Ruppur Nuclear Power Plant, Padma river, Hardinge Bridge

- Location of Pabna District in Bangladesh
- Expandable map of Pabna District
- Country: Bangladesh
- Division: Rajshahi Division

Area
  - Total: 2,376.13 km^{2} (917.43 sq mi)

Population (2022)
  - Total: 2,909,624
  - Density: 1,224.52/km^{2} (3,171.50/sq mi)
- Time zone: UTC+06:00 (BST)
- Postal code: 6600
- Area code: 0731
- ISO 3166 code: BD-49
- HDI (2023): 0.696 medium · 7th of 22
- Website: pabna.gov.bd

Pabna District (Bengali: পাবনা জেলা) is a district in west central Bangladesh. It is a geographically and economically important district. Its administrative capital is the eponymous Pabna town. The main five rivers of this district are: Padma, Jamuna, Baral, Atrai and Chiknai.

== History ==
Archeologist Alexander Cunningham conjectured that the name "Pabna" might be derived from the Pundra or Poondrobordhon civilisation, whose capital was Mahasthangarh, the oldest city of Bangladesh, in neighbouring Bogra, but this hypothesis has not received general acceptance among scholars.

In 1859–61, the district was one of the major areas involved in the Indigo revolt. Beginning in Yusufshahi period in 1873, the serfs resisted excessive demands of increased rents by feudal lords (zamindar), They were led by the nouveau riches Banerjees and Dwijendranath Tagore, by forming an Agrarian League. This largely peaceful movement found the support of the Lieutenant-governor of Bengal, George Campbell, who antagonised the absentee feudal lords. These protests are generally referred to as Pabna disturbances. In the following year, the district was one of the worst hit by famine. The peasants' demands were finally partially met with the Rent Law Act of 1885.

In 1875, Raaygonj was transferred back to Pabna from Bogra, and in 1879, a separate judgeship for the districts of Pabna and Bogra was created.

== Geography ==
Pabna forms the south-east boundary of Rajshahi Division. Sirajganj District is on the north-east, while the Padma River, the main stream of the holy river Ganges, in the south separates it from Rajbari District and Kushtia District. The Jamuna River runs along its eastern border separating it from Manikgonj District; and on the north-west, it has a common boundary with the Natore District. Its average maximum temperature is 36.8 °C, and the minimum is 9.6 °C; annual rainfall is 1872 mm. Characteristically, the soil of the district is divided into four, due to the flood plains of the Ganges, Karatoya, Jamuna, and Barind Tracts. Its main rivers are the Ganges, Ichamati, Gumani, Baral, and Hurasagar Rivers. The rivers Padma and Jamuna meet at the south-eastern end of Pabna Aminpur Thana.

=== Rivers ===
The district is intersected by rivers of varying magnitude. The river system, though, is constituted by the Padma and the Jamuna with their interlacing offshoots and tributaries. Besides these flowing streams, the interior has the abandoned beds of old rivers, most of which are dry except in the rains.
The general trend of the drainage of the Serajganj subdivision is from north-west to south-east, with the rivers entering it from the north-west flow into the Jamuna after a tortuous course. In the Sadar subdivision, however, the general slope of the country is from west to east, and the main rivers fall into Hurasagar, an offshoot of the Jamuna.

The following rivers flow through Pabna District:

1. Padma River
2. Ichamati River
3. Baral River
4. Atrai River
5. Chiknai River
6. Jamuna River
7. Kazipur River
8. Karatoya River
9. Hurasgar River
10. Gumany River
11. Rotnai River
12. Badai River
13. Kageshari River
14. Sutikhali River
15. Komla River
16. Chondraboti River
17. Barnai River

=== Climate ===
Climate data for Pabna
Month	Jan	Feb	Mar	Apr	May	Jun	Jul	Aug	Sep	Oct	Nov	Dec	Year
Mean daily maximum °C (°F)	23.3 (73.9)	27.5 (81.5)	33.6 (92.5)	36.8 (98.2)	35.2 (95.4)	32.8 (91.0)	31.7 (89.1)	31.8 (89.2)	32.2 (90.0)	31.6 (88.9)	29.1 (84.4)	25.9 (78.6)	31.0 (87.7)
Daily mean °C (°F)	16.4 (61.5)	20.2 (68.4)	26.0 (78.8)	29.7 (85.5)	29.9 (85.8)	29.1 (84.4)	28.8 (83.8)	29.1 (84.4)	29.2 (84.6)	27.6 (81.7)	23.3 (73.9)	19.1 (66.4)	25.7 (78.3)
Mean daily minimum °C (°F)	9.6 (49.3)	12.9 (55.2)	18.5 (65.3)	22.8 (73.0)	24.6 (76.3)	25.6 (78.1)	25.9 (78.6)	26.4 (79.5)	26.2 (79.2)	23.6 (74.5)	17.5 (63.5)	12.4 (54.3)	20.5 (68.9)
Average precipitation mm (inches)	19 (0.7)	18 (0.7)	34 (1.3)	56 (2.2)	159 (6.3)	300 (11.8)	260 (10.2)	294 (11.6)	242 (9.5)	201 (7.9)	17 (0.7)	3 (0.1)	1,603 (63)
Average relative humidity (%)	45	36	39	44	59	73	74	76	72	68	52	49	57
Source: National newspapers

== Demographics ==
Historical population
Year	Pop.	±% p.a.
1974	1,255,638	—
1981	1,545,679	+3.01%
1991	1,919,896	+2.19%
2001	2,176,270	+1.26%
2011	2,523,179	+1.49%
2022	2,909,624	+1.30%

According to the 2022 Census of Bangladesh, Pabna District has 743,558 households and a population of 2,909,624 with an average 3.86 people per household. Among the population, 533,571 (18.34%) inhabitants are under 10 years of age. The population density is 1,225 people per km^{2}. Pabna District has a literacy rate (age 7 and over) of 70.49%, compared to the national average of 74.80%, and a sex ratio of 99.38 males per 100 females. Approximately, 22.00% (640,077) of the population live in urban areas. The ethnic population was 2,369.

Religions in Pabna District (2022)
Religion	Percent
Islam	97.21%
Hinduism	2.55%
Other or not stated	0.24%

Religion	1941 (Note: Sadar subdivision of erstwhile Pabna district.)		1981		1991		2001		2011		2022	
Religion	Pop.	%	Pop.	%	Pop.	%	Pop.	%	Pop.	%	Pop.	%
Islam	497,429	73.29%	1,439,949	93.16%	1,826,245	95.12%	2,099,160	96.46%	2,445,702	96.93%	2,828,381	97.21%
Hinduism	178,913	26.36%	101,444	6.56%	86,458	4.50%	73,839	3.39%	73,487	2.91%	74,265	2.55%
Others (Note: Including Jainism, Christianity, Buddhism, Zoroastrianism, Judaism, Ad-Dharmis, or not stated)	2,352	0.35%	4,286	0.28%	7,193	0.38%	3,271	0.15%	3,990	0.16%	6,978	0.24%
Total Population	678,694	100%	1,545,679	100%	1,919,896	100%	2,176,270	100%	2,523,179	100%	2,909,624	100%

Muslims are the overwhelming majority. The Hindu population has continuously decreased from 1981, when it was a high of 100,000, to 74,000 in 2011. Christians also form a minority in urban areas.

== Economy ==
- Main occupations: Agriculture 34%, agricultural farm-hands 22.77%, wage labourer 4.46%, transport 2.18%, weavers 2.85%, commerce 13.27%, service 7.26%, and others 13.21%
- Land control: Among the peasants, 29% are landless peasants, with 49% small, 18% intermediate, and 4% rich
- Value of land: The market value of the land of the first grade is Tk 155000 per 0.01 acre
- Crops: Paddy rice, jute, wheat, sugarcane, oil seeds, onion, garlic, betel leaf (paan), pulses
- Extinct or nearly extinct crops: Indigo, sesame, linseed, cereals such as kaaun and cheena, and orhor pulses
- Fruits: Mango, jackfruit, banana, lychee (lichu), coconut, guava, pomelo, and papaya
- Fisheries, dairies, and poultries: 1069 dairies, 88 fisheries, 714 poultry, and 37 hatcheries
- Industries: Ishwardi EPZ; Pakshey paper mill, sugar mill, cotton mill, jute press, edible oil mill, Square Pharmaceuticals, biscuit factory. The most prominent rice industry is Purbasha Automatic Rice Mills Ltd. in Ishwardi and flour mill (Rouf and Sons Flour Mill), ice factory, welding, saw mill, and cold storage. The SQUARE group established several factories in the district, namely pharmaceuticals, spices, food, toiletries, and textiles, and converted the agricultural economy of Pabna to an industrial society
- Cottage industries: Hand loom, bamboo and caneworks, blacksmith, goldsmith, potteries, woodworks, and tailoring
- Main exports: Rice, jute, betel leaf, hosiery goods, cotton, cotton fabrics
- Active NGOs: BRAC, CARE, ASA, Grameen Bank, Caritas, Proshika, Shomota, Thengamaara Mohila Shobuj Shongho (TMSS), Polli Progoti, ASEAB, BOSS

=== Irrigation ===
Water from the river Jamuna is pumped from Bera pump house to the east through the Baral river.

== Points of interest ==
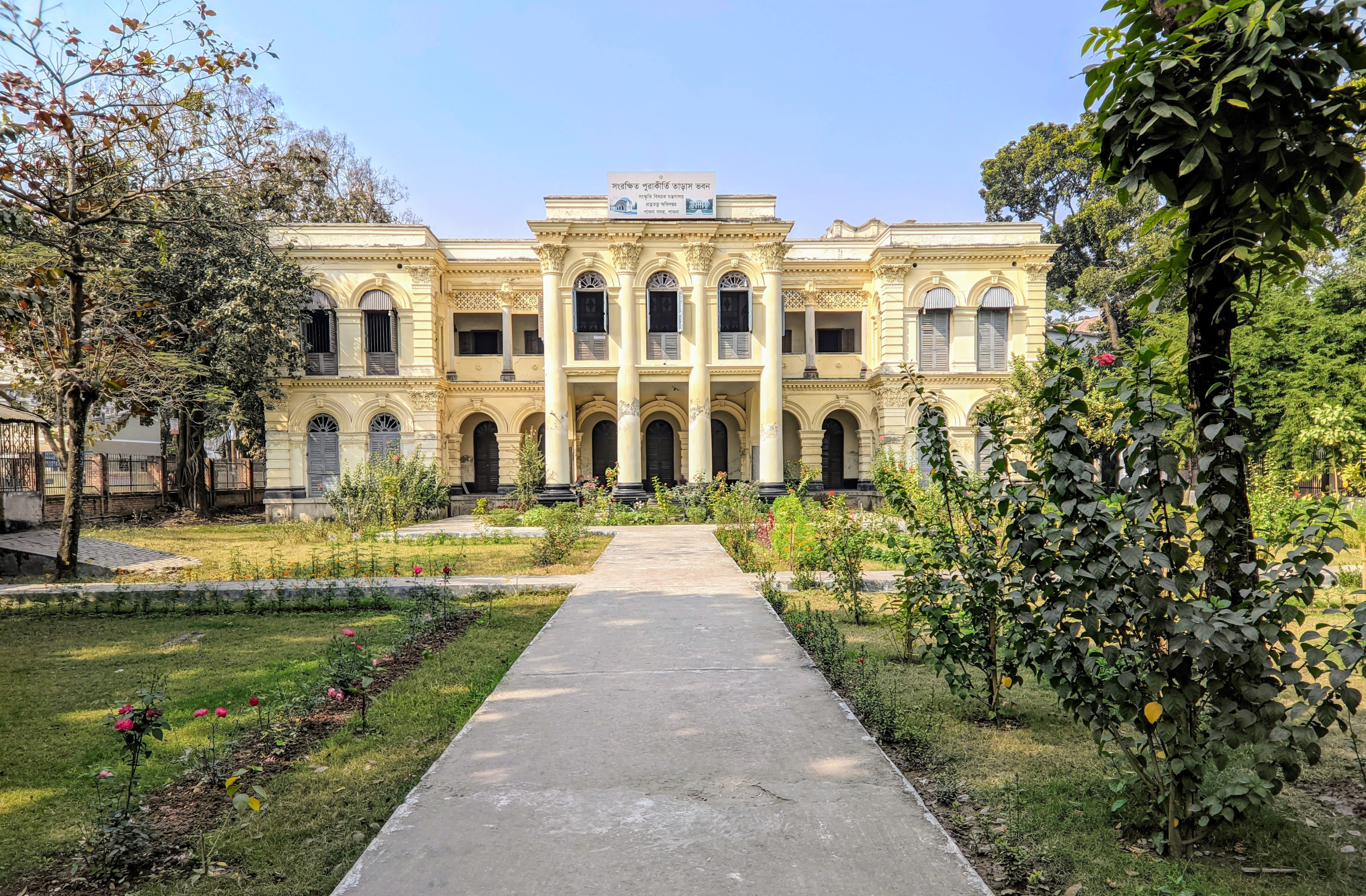
Tarash Palace

Pakshey is a popular green area and a small town. The railway colony of Paksey, divisional headquarters of Bangladesh Railway, has many old trees and is beside the river Padma and the Hardinge Bridge. An export processing zone (EPZ) and the newly built Lalon Shah Bridge are situated here.

Idyllic Poddar Par (the bank of the Padma) at Shilaaidoho Ghaat is 5 km south of town's old Technical Institute, where people can enjoy a river cruise. A river crossing (ghaat) here connects to Shilaaidoho of Kumarkhali Upazila of Kushtia District. Nobel laureate poet Rabindranath Tagore had a Koothibari (villa) at Shilaaidoho, where his birth anniversary is celebrated regularly.

Bangladesh Mental Hospital, Pabna is a hospital beside Pabna's main town, and the only mental hospital in Bangladesh. Mental patients from anywhere in Bangladesh go there to get treatment.

There is a marshy area, Chalan Beel, in the north.

Dhalarchar (Aminpur) was famous for crime, but it is now popular and valuable for its geographical position after established Aminpur Thana.

== Administration ==
Pabna District upazila geocode map

The district comprises nine upazilas:

1. Atgharia Upazila
2. Bera Upazila
3. Bhangura Upazila
4. Chatmohar Upazila
5. Faridpur Upazila (formerly Banwari Nagar)
6. Ishwardi Upazila
7. Pabna Sadar Upazila
8. Santhia Upazila
9. Sujanagar Upazila

== Health ==
A general hospital and a mental hospital are in Pabna. The 11 thanas of the district hold a Upazila health complex each. Each Upazila health complex has qualified doctors who got appointment through Bangladesh Civil Service (BCS) commission. For better treatment, people need to go to medical college and other tertiary hospitals in Rajshahi or Dhaka. The 250-bed government general hospital is here, with a 450-bed mental hospital, second oldest in Indian subcontinent, only after Ranchi Mental Hospital, Jharkhand, India. Recently, government-owned Pabna Medical College and Hospital has been set up. Around 15 health clinics are available in Pabna.

Mental Hospital, Pabna and Pabna Medical College and Hospital are built on land donated by Lord Thakur Anukulchandra at Hemayetpur.

Centre for the Rehabilitation of the Paralysed has started its 10th subcenter at Pabna in the name of "CRP- Pabna Diabetic Shamity" from January 2017 with the collaboration of Pabna Diabetic Shamity to provide rehabilitation services such as physiotherapy, occupational therapy, speech and language therapy, awareness raising program regarding disability and rehabilitation, and scarf-injury prevention, and also provide assistive devices to the persons with disabilities.

== Transport ==
Roads, waterways, railways, and one airport are present. The traditional paalkee (sedans), tomtom (horse carriages), and gorur gaari (bullock carts) are now going out of the fashion. The nosimon and korimon, locally made mechanical haulers using irrigation pumps as their main engines, are mainly used for transporting agricultural goods and rural folks. Inexpensive Chinese electric and petrol autobikes (tricycles) are gaining popularity as urban transport. Dhaka is about five hours by road. Hardinge Bridge and Lalon Shah Bridge over the Padma-linked Pabna with Kushtia District and Khulna Division and the southern Bangladesh. Before the Partition of India, it was a major stoppage for trains from Kolkata to Assam and Darjeeling. Pabna is also connected to Dhaka by the age old roadway through the Jamuna River crossing at Nogorbari, opposite to the river crossing of Aricha at Manikgonj District. It is also very well connected with Dhaka by modern roads through Jamuna Bridge. There is a new rail link established in Pabna town.

Pabna Railway Station is situated in near Pabna Central Bus Terminal. Nearby rail stations are situated in Tebunia, Chatmohar Upazila and Ishwardi Upazila. Ishwardi Upazila is one of the important railway junctions of the North Bengal as well as in Bangladesh. There are nine rail stations in this district: Ishwardi, Pakshi, Muladuli, Chatmohar, Bhangura, Baral Bridge, Sharat Nagar, Dilpashar and Guakhara. Pabna is well connected by road, rail, river or air to the rest of the country.

Ishwardi Upazila has an airport. Biman Bangladesh Airlines used to operate twice-weekly services to Ishwardi from Hazrat Shahjalal International Airport, Dhaka, but no airline is operating to and from Ishwardi now.

Several Dhaka-bound private bus services are available: Pabna Express, Shyamoli Parbahan, Sarkar Travels, Raja Badshah, Ishurdi Express, Shahzadpur Travels, Baadol, Night Star, Kings, Esha, Mahanagar, Capital Service, Sakal Shandha, Uttara, B Nagar, Al Hamra, etc. The government-owned Bangladesh Road Transport Corporation (BRTC) provides bus services to Rajshahi and Bogra cities. Water transport is important, as the Padma and other rivers and Chalan Beel are situated in Pabna. In the Pabna district, ride by nosimon, rickshawvan, and korimon are pleasant.

== Education ==
Overall, literacy for males is 71.8% and for females 65.7%. A renowned science and technology university, Pabna University of Science and Technology, is located there, as are 34 colleges, a cadet college, a law college, a government polytechnic institute, a government vocational training institute, a textiles college, a government commerce college, a teachers' training college, a primary teacher's training institute, a nursing training institute, a homoeopathic college, 202 high schools, 29 junior high schools, a Madrassa Aliya, 261 qaomi madrassa (seminary), 667 government primary schools, 445 nongovernment primary schools, eight community schools, 29 kindergartens, 32 satellite schools, 299 NGO-operated schools, and a music college. Pabna Zilla School, Pabna Edward College, and Banwarinagar C.B. Pilot High School of this district are very old in the region–over a hundred years.

Noted educational institutions are:

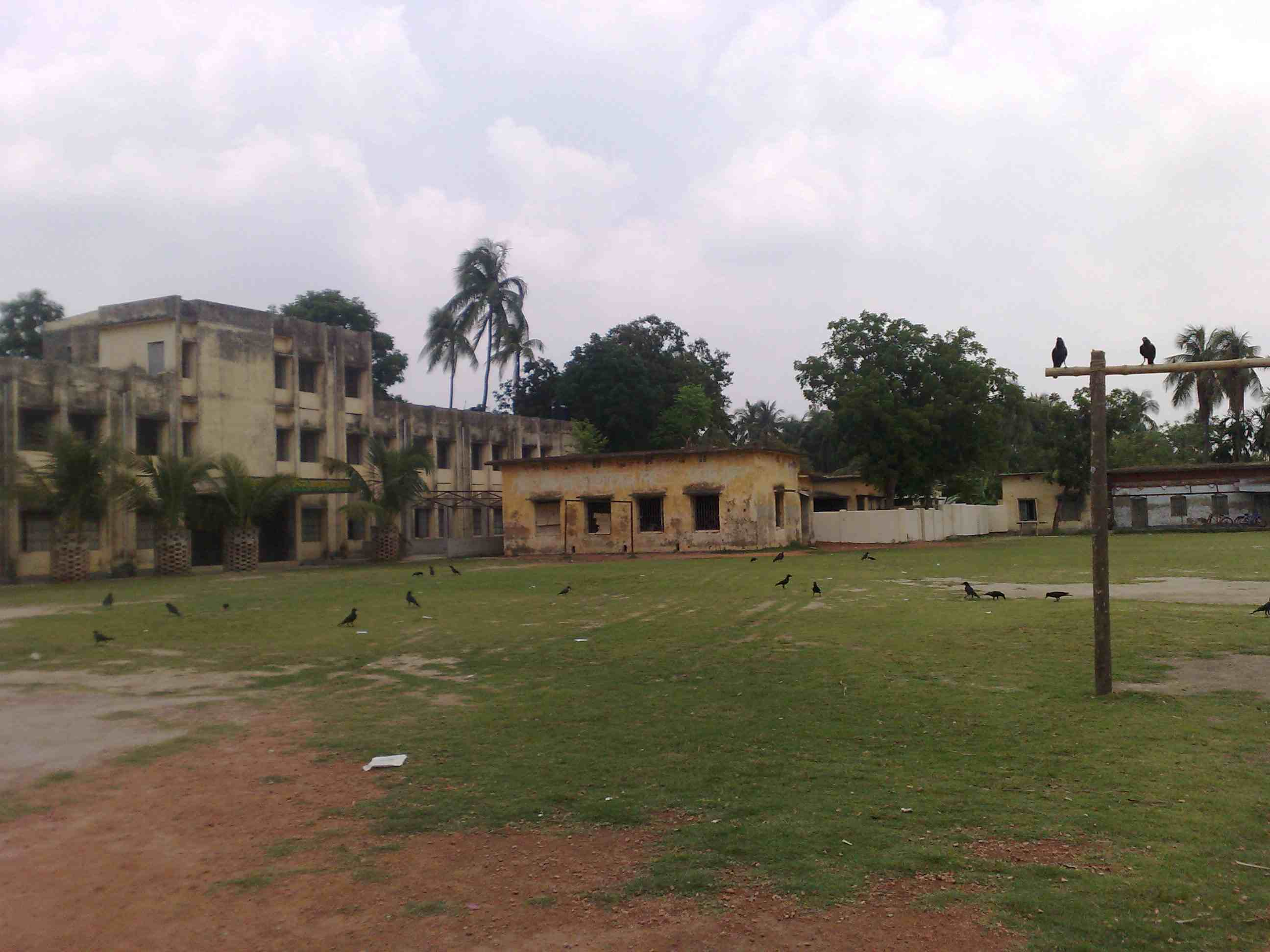
Pabna Zilla School

School

- Pabna Cadet College (1981)
- Bansherbada ML High School, Ishwardi, Pabna (1917)
- Pabna Zilla School (1853)
- Pabna Govt. Girls High School (1883)
- Govt. Edward College, Pabna (founded 1898)
- Pabna University of Science and Technology (2008)
- Pabna Medical College (2008)
- Pabna Textile Engineering College (2008)
- Pabna Polytechnic Institute (1962)
- Govt Technical School and College, Pabna (1889)
- Selim Nazir High School (1924)
- North Point School & College, Pabna (2015)
- Pabna Collectorate Public School and College (2008)
- North Bengal Paper Mills High School, Paksey (1972)
- R.M Academy School & College, Pabna
- Jagir Hossain Academy, Pabna (1983)
- Al-hera Academy School and College (1987)
- Gopal Chandra Institution (GCI) (1894)
- Galaxy School & College Bera-Pabna (2001)
- Atghoreia Government College (1972)
- Atghoria Government High School (1954)
- Government Shahid Bulbul College
- Pabna City College
- Banwarinagar Cornation Bonomali Pilot High School (1912), Faridpur
- Basanta Raha Institute of engineering and health science (1899)
- Shahid Fazlul Haque Municipal High School (1967)
- Banglamotion Institute of Engineering & Technology (2012)
- Pabna Town Girls High School (1903)
- Madrassa Aliya (1925)
- MC Jubilee High School (1936)
- Pabna Cadet Collegiate School (1993)
- Online.net (IT School) (2000)
- Amina Monsoor Girls High School (2002)
- Ataikula High School (1938)
- Bhangura Union High School
- Bhangura Jarina Rahim Girls High School
- Haji Jamal Uddin Degree College
- Bhangura Alia Madrassa
- Hadol Madrassa, Debottor, Atgharia, Pabna
- Government Primary School (1880)
- Varenga (Bera) Academy (1835)
- Bera B B High School (1899)
- Adarsha High School, Kaitola (1972)
- Bera High School (1906)
- Monjur Kadir Mohila College, Bera, Pabna (1990)
- Dhobakhola Coronation High School (1906)
- Banwarinagar Pilot Girls High School (1972), Faridpur
- Shara (Ishwardi) Marwari School (1917)
- Khalilpur (Shujanogor) High School (1901)
- Bhadurpur Government Primary School (1909)
- JotGoury Jalalpur Government Primary School (1943)
- Dulai High School (1967)
- Pabna Collectorate Public School and lege (2009)
- Khan Pura High School (1918)
- Malifa Habibor Rahman Multilateral High School (1957)
- Masundia Bhabanipur K.J.B College
- Masundia Bhabanipur High School
- Pabna College, Pabna (1983)
- Nariagodai High School, Nariagodai, Santhia, Pabna (1963)
- Kashinathpur Abdul Latif High School, Pabna
- Sujanager Pilot Model High School And College (1956)
- Karanja Pre Cadet School & College (2005)
- Pakuria School and College (1907)
- Imam Hossain Academy, Santhia, Pabna (2001)
- Santhia Pilot High School, Santhia (1943)
- Chatmohar RCN & BSN High School & College (1861)
- Saint Rts. High School, Mothurapur, Chatmohar, Pabna (1970)
- Chiknai High School, Mulgram, Chatmahor
- Chatmohar Pilot Girls High School (1970)
- Chatmohar Government Degree (hons) College (1970)
- Tebunia Wasim Pathshala, Tebunia, Pabna
- Samsul Huda Degree College, Tebunia, Pabna
- Shaheed Abdul Khaleque High School, Khidirpur, Atgharia, Pabna
- Par Khidirpur High School, Atgharia, Pabna
- Ramchandrapur High School, Atgharia, Pabna
- Khidirpur College, Atgharia, Pabna
- Par Khidirpur College, Atgharia, Pabna
- Aftab Nagr High School, Santhia, Pabna 1965

== Newspapers ==
Locally published newspapers and periodicals include:

- Ichamati
- Uttor Janoata (Ishwardi)
- Gayana Bikashini
- Pabna Barta
- Bibriti
- Arshi
- Jamuna
- Charmohar Barta
- Faridpur Barta
- Junction
- Jonodabi (Ishwardi)
- Gayana Prava
- Palli Darpan
- Manashi
- Amar Desh
- Pabna
- Tawhid
- Sachetan

National dailies are also available.

== Notable residents ==
- Thakur Anukulchandra, guru, physician and founder of Satsang Ashram
- Group Captain (Rtd.) Saiful Azam, former pilot of Bangladesh Air Force, Pakistan Air Force, Jordanian Air Force and Iraqi Air Force, war hero of 1965 Indo-Pakistani War and 1967 Arab-Israeli War (Six-Day War)
- Selina Banu, politician
- General Joyanto Nath Chaudhuri OBE, former Chief of Army Staff of the Indian Army
- Pramatha Chaudhuri, writer
- Samson H. Chowdhury, former chairman of Square Group
- Prasannamoyee Devi, writer
- Priyamvada Devi, writer
- Amzad Hossain, MNA (Member of National Assembly of Pakistan), organizer of Independence War
- A. B. Mirza Azizul Islam, advisor of military-backed caretaker government
- Air Vice Marshal (Rtd.) A. K. Khandker, first Chief of Staff of Bangladesh Air Force (1971–1975), and former Planning Minister
- Mohammed Shahabuddin Chuppu, jurist, politician, civil servant and former President of Bangladesh
- Mozid Mahmud, poet and essayist
- Amiya Bhushan Majumdar, Indian novelist
- Bonde Ali Miah, poet
- Motiur Rahman Nizami, Ameer (chairman) of Jamaat-e-Islami Bangladesh, former Member of Jatiyo Sangsad (2001–2006), former Minister of Agriculture (2001–2003)
- Shreemati Rasasundari, 19th century writer
- Dilip Bagchi, Bengali mass singer and political activist
- Kamal Ahmed, singer, administrator
- Suchitra Sen, actress
- Mazidul Islam Moni, former footballer and fighter
