= Hemayetpur =

Village in Pabna, Bangladesh

Coordinates: 24.004°N 89.208°E

Hemayetpur হেমায়েতপুর
- Village
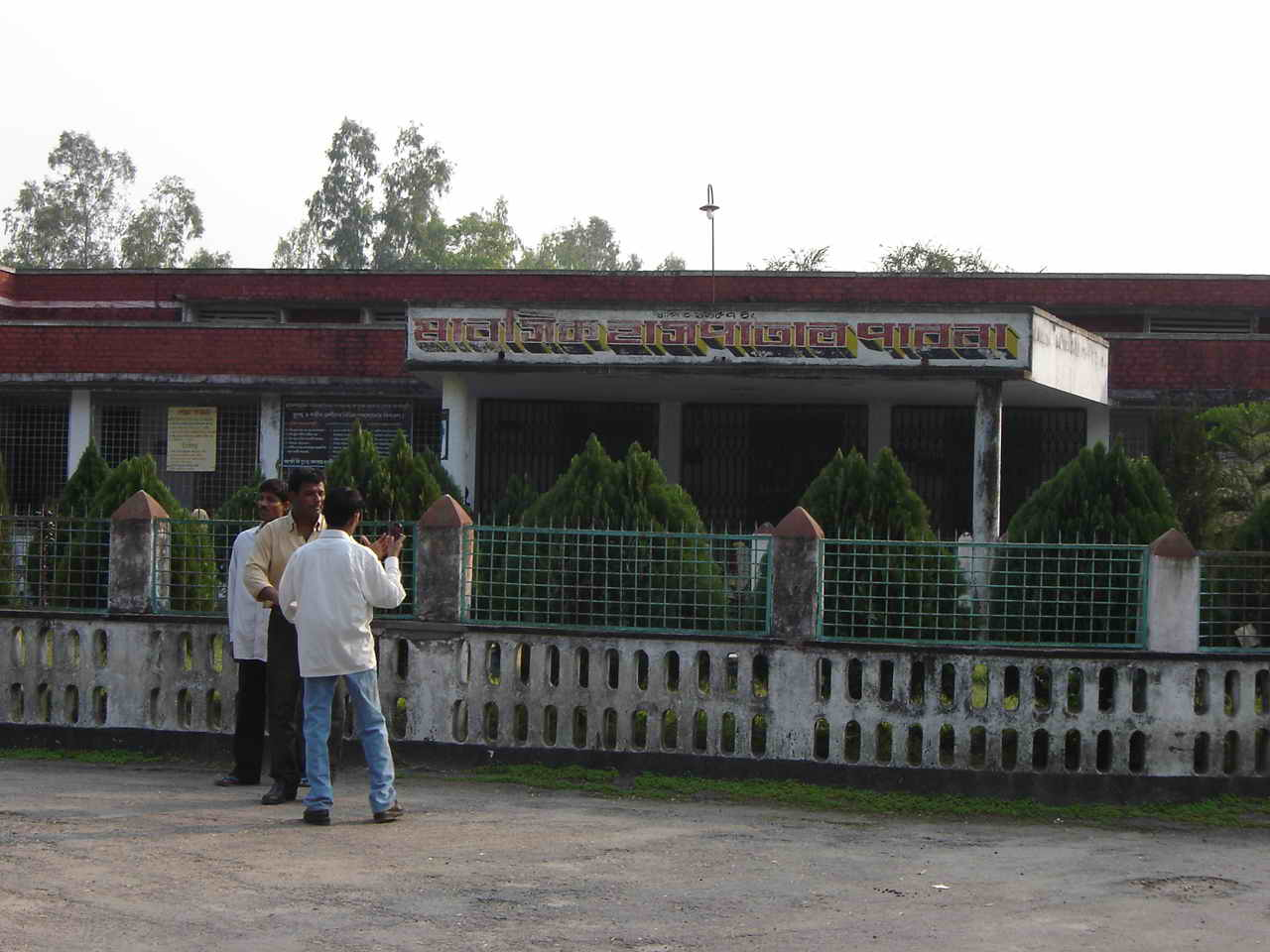
- Pabna Mental Hospital, the only government-run mental facility in Bangladesh
- Interactive map of Hemayetpur
- Country: Bangladesh
- Division: Rajshahi
- District: Pabna

Hemayetpur or Himaitpur (Bengali: হেমায়েতপুর) is a small village of Pabna Sadar Upazila in Pabna District of Bangladesh. It is situated on the bank of Padma river.

This is birthplace of Sree Sree Thakur Anukulchandra. He initiated a spiritual movement in Bangladesh which subsequently spread to India. He preached the simplicity of life and attainment of high spiritual realization. He never advocated austerity and instead promoted the normal way of life through which self-realization could be attained. He was a physician, educationist and social reformer, who influenced great leaders of his time. Mahatma Gandhi visited him in Himaitpur as did other leaders, to seek his views and draw inspiration for creating a new India. He had built a philanthropic organization called 'Satsang' in Himaitpur. Sri Sri Thakur Anukulchandra left Himaitpur and came to Deoghar, Jharkhand, India on 1 September 1946 and in 1947 the partition of India happened. The Satsang buildings of Sree Sree Thakur were taken over by the then Eastern Pakistan (now Bangladesh) government with Vested Property Act. Pabna Mental Hospital was moved into them in 1960. The entire property of Sree Sree Thakur still remains public property of Bangladesh Government till today.

Hemayetpur has the only government-run mental hospital in Bangladesh.

== See also ==
- List of villages in Bangladesh
