= Jagannath Temple, Pabna =

Hindu temple in Bangladesh

Coordinates: 24.3152°N 89.3588°E

Jagannath Temple located in Chatmohar Upazila of Pabna District, Bangladesh is dedicated to the Hindu god Jagannath. Locally known as the Handial Mandir, the temple was built between 1300 and 1400 CE. The temple is famous for its terracotta sculptures, and has been described as one of the most beautiful Hindu temples in Northern Bangladesh. The temple is incurring damage by high salinity from the soil it is built on.
