= Kamal Ahmed (singer) =

Bangladeshi singer (born 1965)

- কামাল আহমেদ
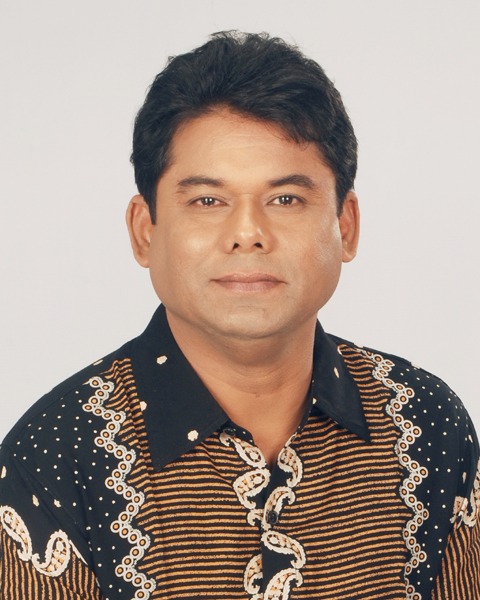
- Kamal Ahmed in 2012
- Born: 9 September 1965 (age 60); Pabna, Bangladesh
- Education: University of Dhaka
- Occupations: Singer; Administrator
- Years active: 1991–present
- Parents: Kiam Uddin Biswas (father); Aziza Khatun (mother)
- Awards: See below
- Musical career
- Genres: Rabindra Sangeet; Modern song
- Instruments: Vocal; Harmonium
- Label: Music Of Bengal
- Website: Official Website; Official YouTube Channel

Kamal Ahmed (born 9 September 1965) is a Bangladeshi Rabindra Sangeet (also known as Tagore songs) singer. He was the Deputy Director General (Program) at Bangladesh Betar.

== Early life ==
Ahmed was born at village Khonkra in Pabna Sadar Upazila on 9 September 1965 to Kiam Uddin Biswas and Aziza Khatun. He has a son, Ahmed Rezwan Protik, and a daughter, Ahmed Rehnuma Prokriti.

== Education ==
After passing HSC examinations from Pabna Edward College in 1982, Ahmed got an opportunity to study Soil Science in Dhaka University. The chance to study at Dhaka was the turning point for him to be associated with Chhayanaut, a cultural organization committed to build up music talents, especially those of Tagore singers. There he came closure to veteran Tagore singers like Wahidul Haque, Sanjida Khatun, Ikhtiar Omar, Serajus Salekin and others. He received lessons on classical music as well from Ustad Phool Mohammad. In his student life at Dhaka University, he was one of the members of Board of Directors of the DUCSU Cultural Team. He represented the cultural troops of DUCSU to perform Tagore songs at Kolkata University and Kalyani University in India in the 1980s. He was elected "Cultural Secretary" of Hall Union and won as the champion of cultural week of Shahidullah Hall, Dhaka University.

== Career ==
Ahmed was the President, of ``BCS Information Betar Officer's Welfare Association". He was the Secretary General of ``9th BCS Forum" (2016-2018 and 2018–2020). He was the Adviser (Barishal-2008), Vice President (Khulna : 2005–2006) and Member of Board of Directors (Khulna : 2003–2004) of ``Rabindra Sangeet Shammilon Parishad".

Prior to beginning his career in the Bangladesh Civil Service (BCS), Ahmed opted for the information cadre as his first choice, although he could have joined the administrative cadre. He joined Bangladesh Betar in 1991. He had worked over 30 years in Bangladesh Betar and 3 years in Bangladesh Television. Having a master's degree from Dhaka University and professional training in mass communication, mass communication research, networking and programme development for electronic mass media, he was the Deputy Director General (Program) of Bangladesh Betar. Besides, Artist Kamal Ahmed is the Literary and Cultural Secretary of Dr. Muhammad Shahidullah Hall Alumni Association.

Many of Ahmed's albums are based on Tagore songs and besides performing on stage regularly on Bangladesh Betar and Bangladesh Television, and different other satellite TV channels in the country, he has performed Tagore songs in India, and Sri Lanka.

Ahmed performed Tagore songs in India, Sri Lanka and Canada. He also performed at the Indira Gandhi Cultural Centre Solo Program and the National Museum Solo Program and the Rajshahi Betar Shilpee Shangstha Solo Program.

Ahmed also released music video titled : Bhulite Parina Take (Modern), Bhalobeshe Shakhi (Tagore), Megh Rong (Modern).

Ahmed has traveled in Canada, Australia, New Zealand, Singapore, Zimbabwe, Sri Lanka, India, Nepal, United Arab Emirates, and Saudi Arabia on professional assignments.

In addition, Kamal Ahmed has officially created a digital archive to preserve and showcase his musical career.

The "Digital Archive of Kamal Ahmed" covers a wide range of information, including the artist's biography, songs, albums, images, news, interviews, song credit, music videos, awards, achievements, and events.

== Performances abroad ==
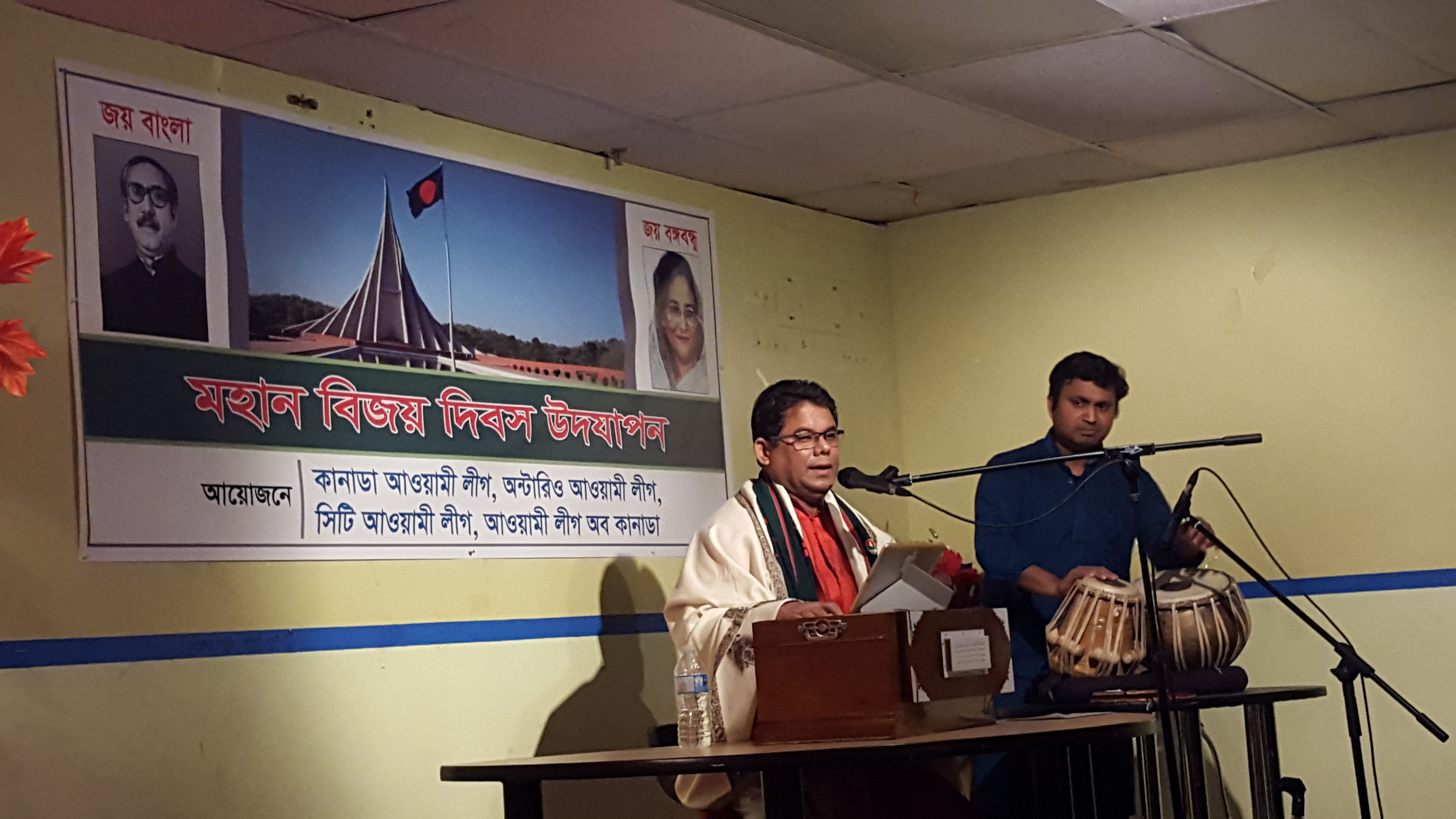
Ahmed Performed at the 2017 Victory Day Program in Canada.

Country	Period	Place
Canada	24 December 2017	Kennedy Convention Centre, Toronto, Canada
Canada	16 December 2017	Mizan Complex Auditorium, Toronto, Canada
India	28 March 2017	On the Occasion of the Death Anniversary of Dhirendranath Dutta, Agartala Press Club, Tripura, India.
India	27 March 2017	Maharaja Birbikram University, Agartala, Tripura, India.
India	26 March 2017	Bangladesh High Commission, Agartala, Tripura, India.
India	4 January 2017	All India Women's Congress, Kolkata.
India	2 January 2017	"Kolpotoru Mela"Razarhat, Kolkata.
India	1 January 2017	National Poetry Festival & Newtown Book Fair, Kolkata.
India	27 March 2016	Birla Academy of Arts & Culture, Kolkata
India	26 March 2016	Rabindra Sadan, Kolkata
Sri Lanka	17 & 26 March 2011	High Commission Hall Room, Bangladesh High Commission, Sri Lanka.
India	9-16 March 1989	Open Stage, Kolkata University Auditorium, Kolkata City Open Stage, Kollyani University

== Awards ==
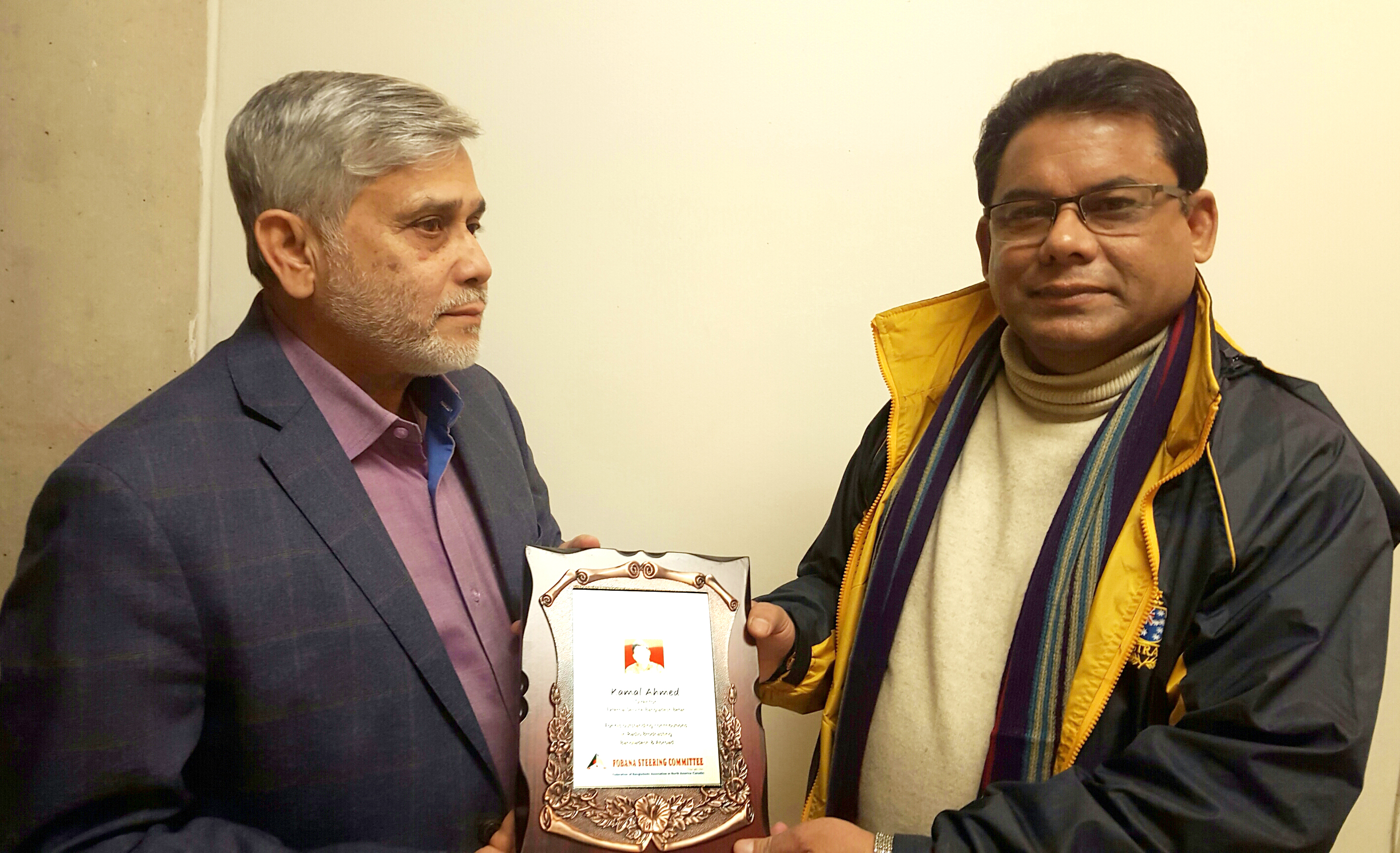
Ahmed Received FOBANA Award (2017)

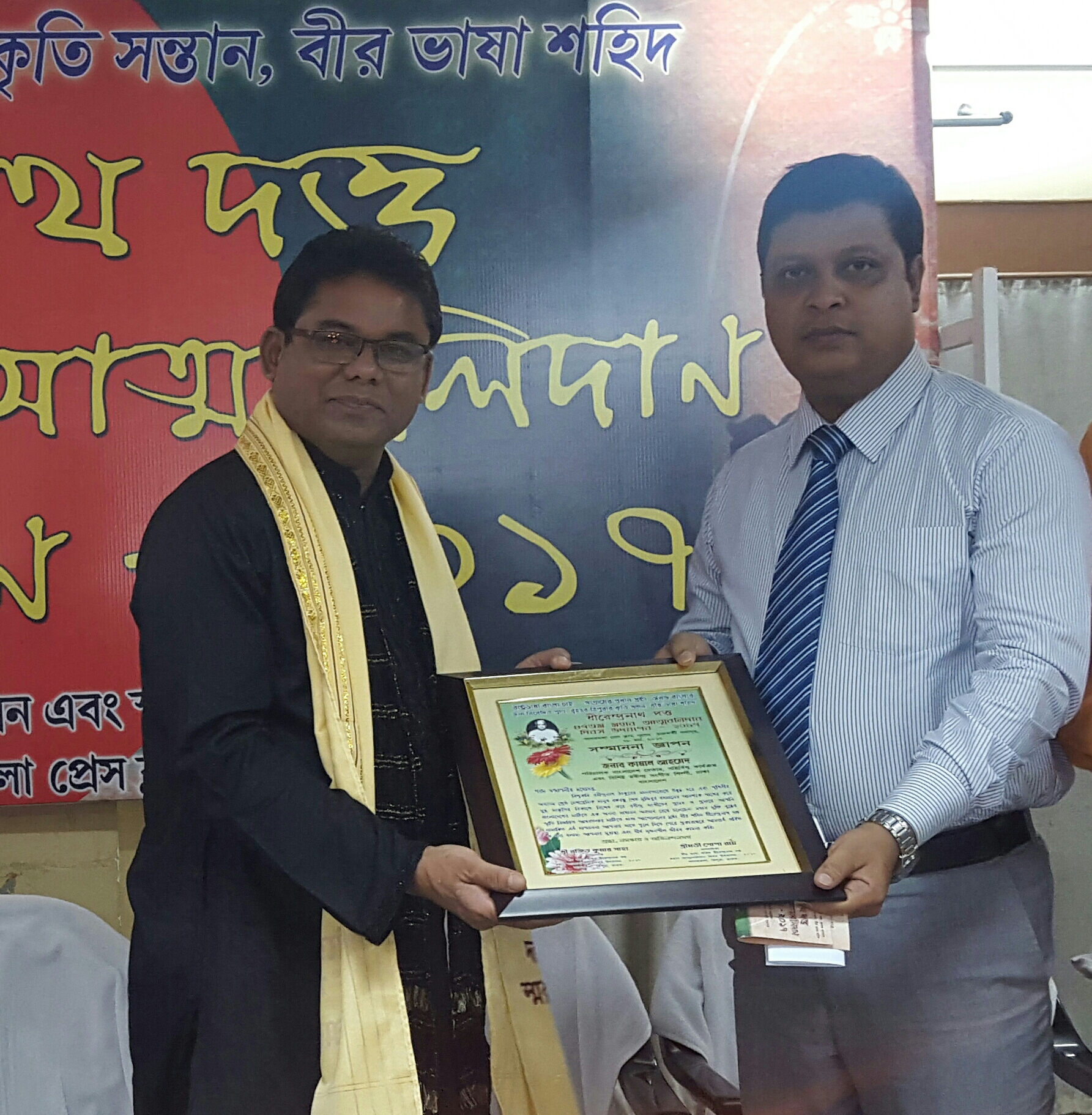
Kamal Ahmed Received Beer Shaheed Dhirendranath Dutta Award 2017

1. SAARC Cultural Society Award (2010)
2. Bangabandhu Research Foundation Podok (2015)
3. Adwaitia Mallabarman Award (2017), From Maharaja Beerbikram University, India
4. Beer Shaheed Dhirendranath Dutta Award (2017), From Agartala, Tripura, India
5. FOBANA Award (2017), From Canada
6. Rajshahi Betar Shilpee Shangstha Shammanona 2018
7. Jatiya Rabindra Gobeshona & Charcha Kendra Shammanona 2019
8. Akash Media Bhuban Award (2022)
9. Bangabandhu Shommanona 2023
10. Friends & Humanity Lifetime Award 2023
11. The International Creative Arts Award (2023) From Dhaka University

== Albums ==
1. Shada Megher Bhela (2007) -Tagore songs
2. Nana Ronger Dinguli (2008) -Tagore songs
3. Poth Chawatei Ananda (2009) -Tagore songs
4. Falguner Dine (2010) -Tagore songs
5. Nishshobdo Charane (2011) -Tagore songs (Mixed Album)
6. Godhuli (2012) – a tribute to Kishore Kumar
7. Kan Pete Roi (2013) -Tagore songs
8. Bendechhi Amar Pran (2014) -Tagore songs
9. Bhora Thak Smritishudhay (2015) -Tagore songs
10. Oadhora (2016) - basic modern songs
11. Gaaner Toree (2016) - songs of three poets
12. Baluka Belay (2016)- a tribute to Hemanta Mukherji
13. Nidrahara Rater Gan (2016) -Tagore songs
14. Durer Bondhu (2016) -Tagore songs
15. Mohakabyer Kobi (2016) - a tribute to Father of the Nation Bangabandhu Sheikh Mujibur Rahman
16. Ekusher Shwaralipi (2019) – songs of Shaheed & International Mother Language Day
17. Neel Shomudro (2020) – romantic duet modern
18. Mohakabyer Kobi (2020) - in Bangladesh - a tribute to Father of The Nation Bangabandhu Sheikh Mujibur Rahman
19. Mohakobi (2020) - a tribute to Father of The Nation Bangabandhu Sheikh Mujibur Rahman
20. Prothom Prem (2021) -Tagore songs
21. Tomaro Oashime - a solo audio album of Tagore songs (2021)
22. Rajneetir Kobi - a tribute to Father of the Nation Bangabandhu Sheikh Mujibur Rahman (2021)
23. Smritir Shohore- duet modern songs (2022)
24. Tomay Gaan Shonabo - a solo audio album of Tagore songs (2022)
25. Srabonghonogohon Mohe - a solo audio album of Tagore songs (2022)
26. Janmobhumi - patriotic songs (2022)
27. Tumi Shondhyaro Meghomala - a solo audio album of Tagore songs (2023)
28. Desher Mati (2023) Tagore songs
29. Biswabhora Pran (2023) Tagore songs
30. Shwaralipi (2024) – romantic duet modern
31. Shwarnalee Godhulee (2024) – romantic duet modern
32. Bonolota Sen - poetry songs of poet Jibanananda Das

== Documentary films ==
Kamal Ahmed, a documentary filmmaker, has directed and produced the film "Jatir Pita Bangabandhu," which explores the life and legacy of Bangabandhu Sheikh Mujibur Rahman. Ahmed took charge of the planning, research, and direction of the project, bringing his extensive expertise to the production of this important documentary.

Ahmed has created a documentary film; Dhonir Oagropothik is a documentary film made to celebrate the diamond jubilee of Bangladesh Betar. The planning, research and direction of the film have all been done by Ahmed.

The documentary highlights the contribution of Bangladesh Betar to the country and the people during the war of liberation in 1971 is highlighted in the documentary.

== Music videos ==
1. Bhulite Parina Take – Modern
2. Bhalobeshe Shakhi - Tagore song
3. Bhora Thak Smritishudhay –Tagore song
4. Megh Rong – Borsha Biroho
5. Ekush Tumi Lal Potaka - song of Shaheed and International Mother Language Day
6. Ekush Manei - song of Shaheed and International Mother Language Day
7. Poloke Heshe Chole Jao - Modern
8. Bhalobashi Bhalobashi - romantic duet modern
9. Shudhu Bhalobasha - romantic duet modern
10. Roktakto August - a tribute to Father of The Nation Bangabandhu Sheikh Mujibur Rahman
11. Rongin Shondhya - romantic duet modern
12. Amar Porichoy - duet patriotic poetry song of Syed Shamsul Haque
13. Amra Dujon- duet romantic modern song
14. Bajrokonther Kobi - duet patriotic poetry song of poet Nirmalendu Goon
15. Mohakobi – song tribute to Bangabandhu
16. Shwadhinota Tumi - duet patriotic poetry song of poet Shamsur Rahman
17. Eakti Manchitro – patriotic song
18. Prothom Kobita – romantic modern song
19. Ek Mohakal – romantic sad modern song
20. Ekoi Brinte – romantic duet modern song
21. Ganer Desh – duet patriotic song
22. Godhuli Ronge – romantic duet modern song
23. Pita - song tribute to Bangabandhu
24. Amar Bhasha Matribhasha - song of 21st
25. Blues Love - Kamal Ahmed & Rumana Islam
26. Matir Tane - duet patriotic song
27. Shwarnalee Godhuli - duet love song
28. Shwapneel Prottasha - love song
29. Mone Pore Tomake - love song
30. Mugdhota - love song
31. Behag Byatha - romantic duet song
32. Tumi - romantic love song
33. Nishshongota - love song
34. Ami Jodi Shurjo Hotam - modern
35. Akashbhora Shurjo-Tara - Rabindra Sangeet
36. Valobashbe Bole - duet love song
37. O Amar Desher Mati - patriotic Rabindra Sangeet
38. Godhuli Ronge - duet love song
39. 39. Thikana - duet patriotic song
40. Shwapno Anka - duet love song
41. Sagor Bendhechhi - Valentine's Day release (2025)
42. Meghbalika - love song
43. Aji Shanjher Jamunay Go - Rabindra Shangeet
44. Biroho - HD love music video (2022)
45. Pothero Prante - HD love music video (2022)
46. Tumi Eaktu Kebol Boshte Dio - Rabindra Shangeet
47. Tajmahal - HD love music video
48. Amar Ea Poth - Rabindra Sangeet
49. Prothom Kobita - Eid music video (2022)
50. Amaro Porano Jaha Chay - Rabindra Sangeet
51. Nandinee - love song
52. Jochhonar Samiyana - love song
53. Dhonya Jibon - HD music video (2021)
54. Anupama - HD music video (2021)
55. Nion Aloy - HD music video (2021)
56. Ekush Tumi Lal Potaka - song of 21st
57. Krishnochura Smriti - HD music video (2021)
58. Dibosho Rajoni - Rabindra Sangeet
59. Jodi Tare Nai Chini Go - Rabindra Sangeet
60. Smriti Rong - romantic love song
61. Dheu ( romantic love song)
