= Tarash Bhaban =

Palace in Bangladesh

Coordinates: 24°00′17″N 89°14′01″E

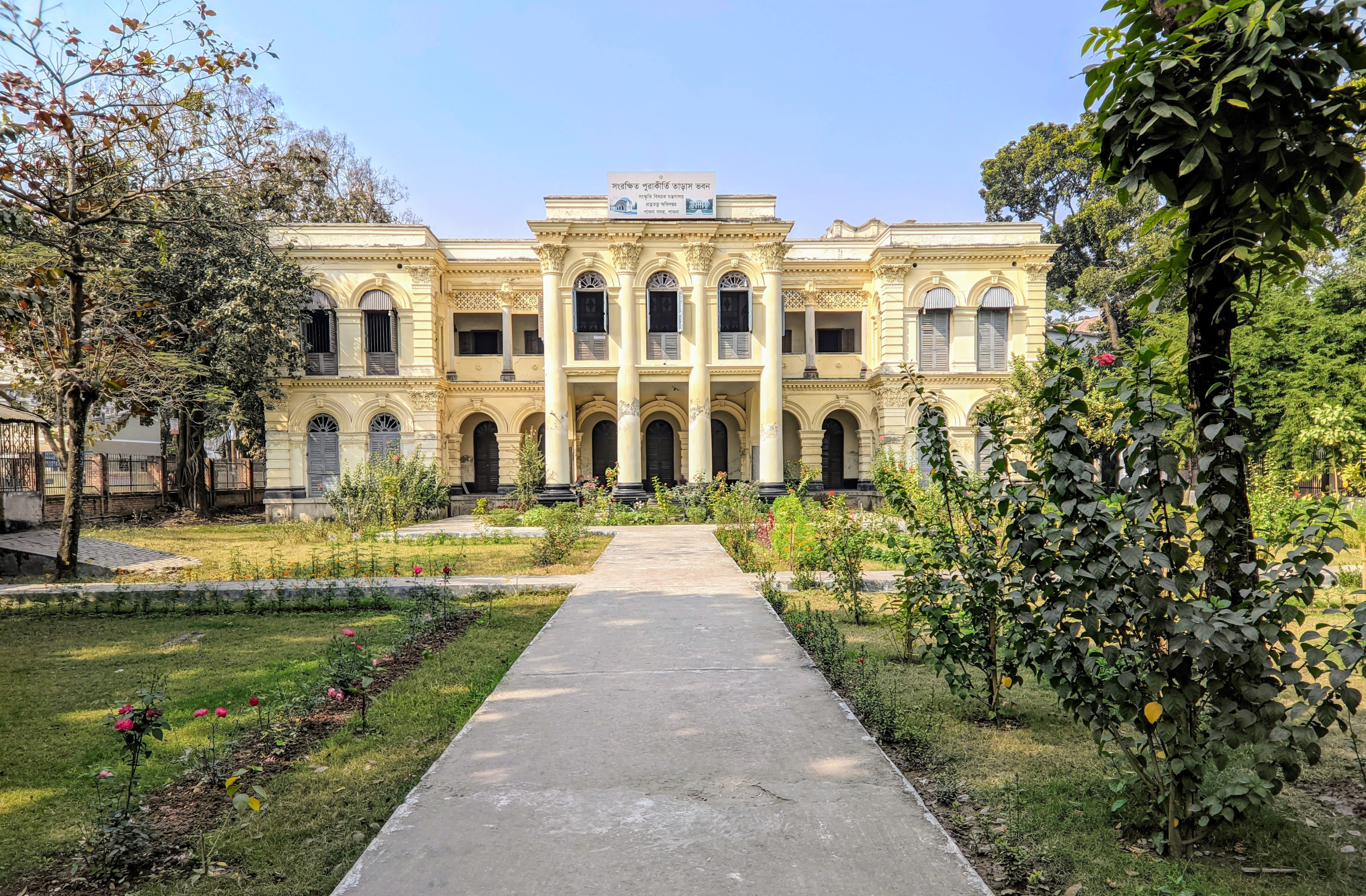
- Creation date: 18th century
- First holder: Rai Bahadur Banamali Roy
- Seat: Zamindars of Tarash

Tarash Bhaban or Tarash Rajbari is one of the significant archaeological landmarks in Bangladesh, located in the city of Pabna. The palace was built in the 18th century.

== History ==
The palace was commissioned during the British colonial period by Rai Bahadur Banamali Roy, the then landlord of Tarash. Its architectural design reflects elements of European Renaissance style. On 8 January 1998, the Department of Archaeology of the Government of Bangladesh listed it as a protected archaeological site. The building served various administrative functions over the years, including housing government offices and temporarily accommodating Pabna Medical College, before being designated as a protected monument by the Department of Archaeology. According to local legend, descendants of the Rai Bahadur zamindar family sought refuge in the building in 1942 during World War II.

== Architecture ==
There is a large entrance in front of this building with various designs on the walls. There are 2 large pillars on either side of the entrance and the entrance is in the middle. Although its design has largely disappeared today, the main building is 30.40 meters (100 feet) long and 18.28 meters (60 feet) wide.

== Gallery ==
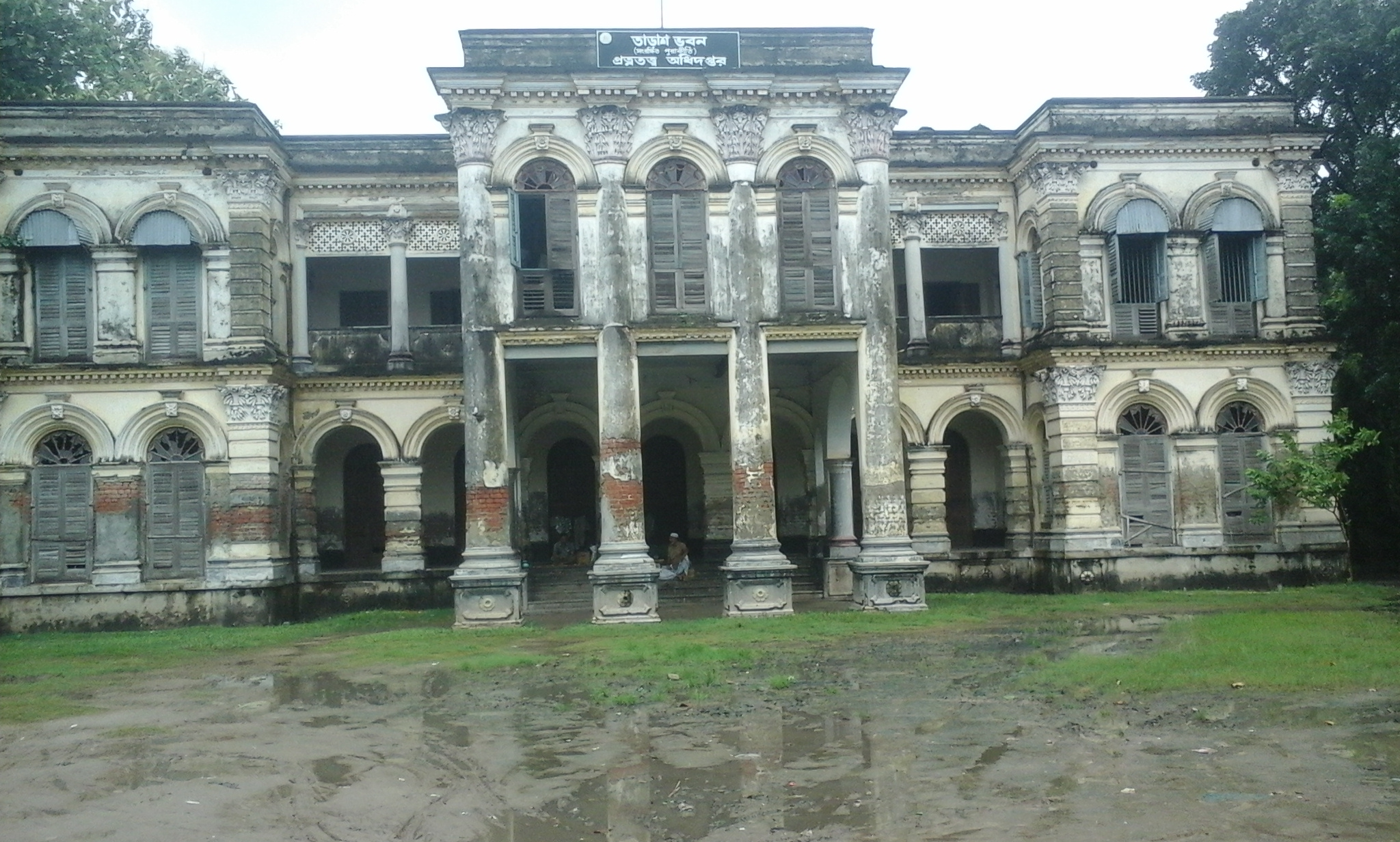
Tarash Bhaban

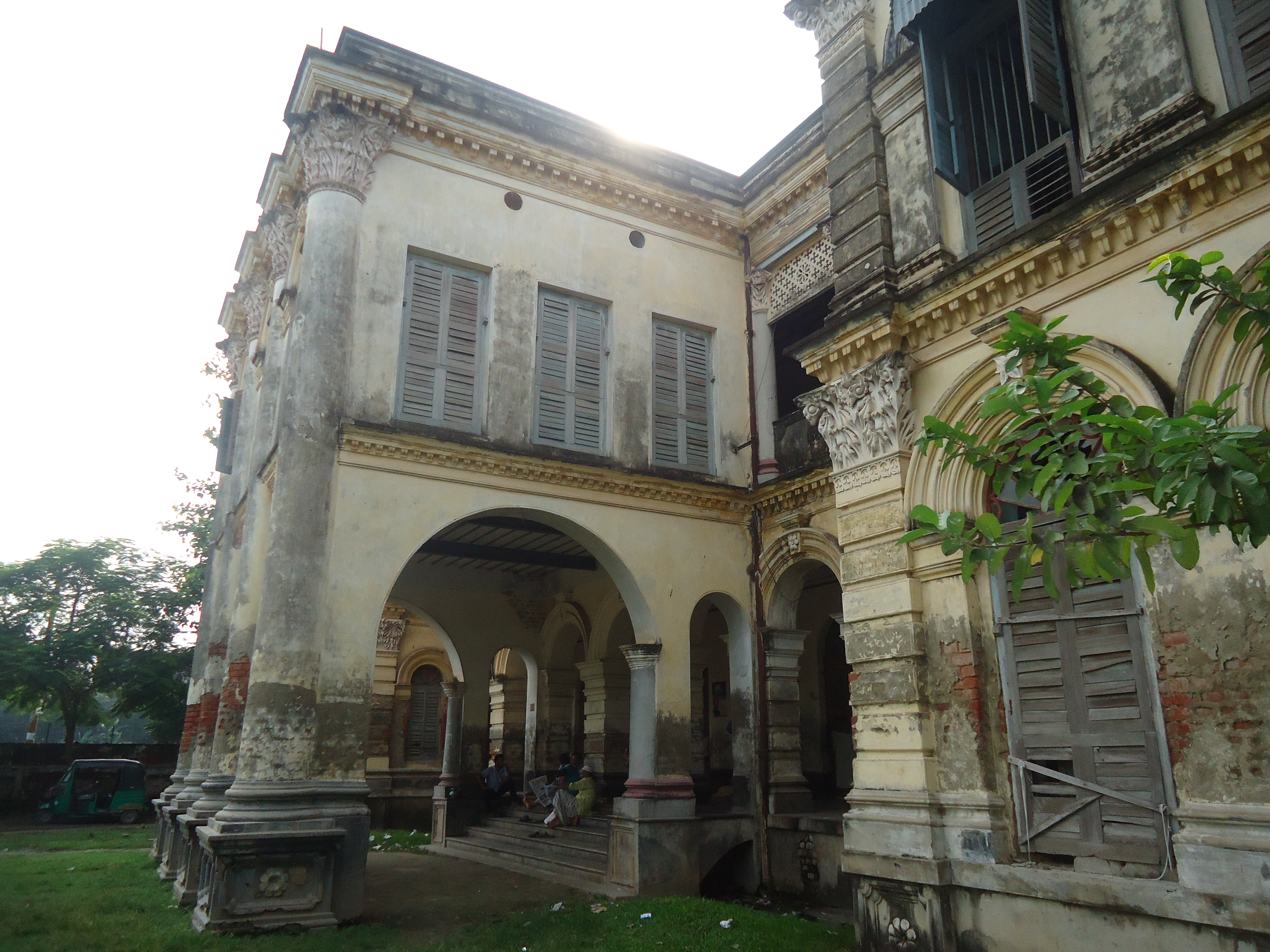
Trash Bhaban

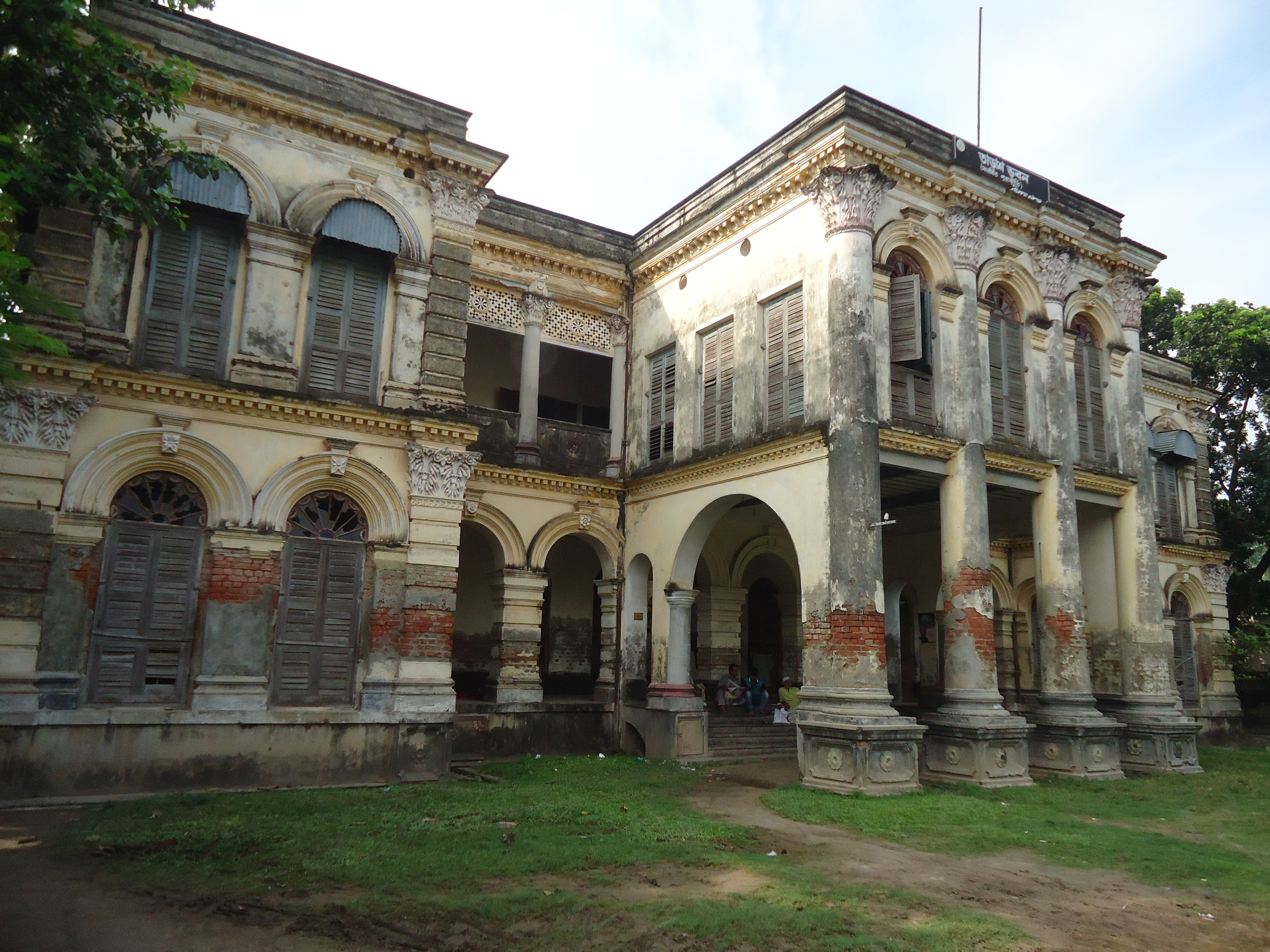
South view of Tarash Bhaban

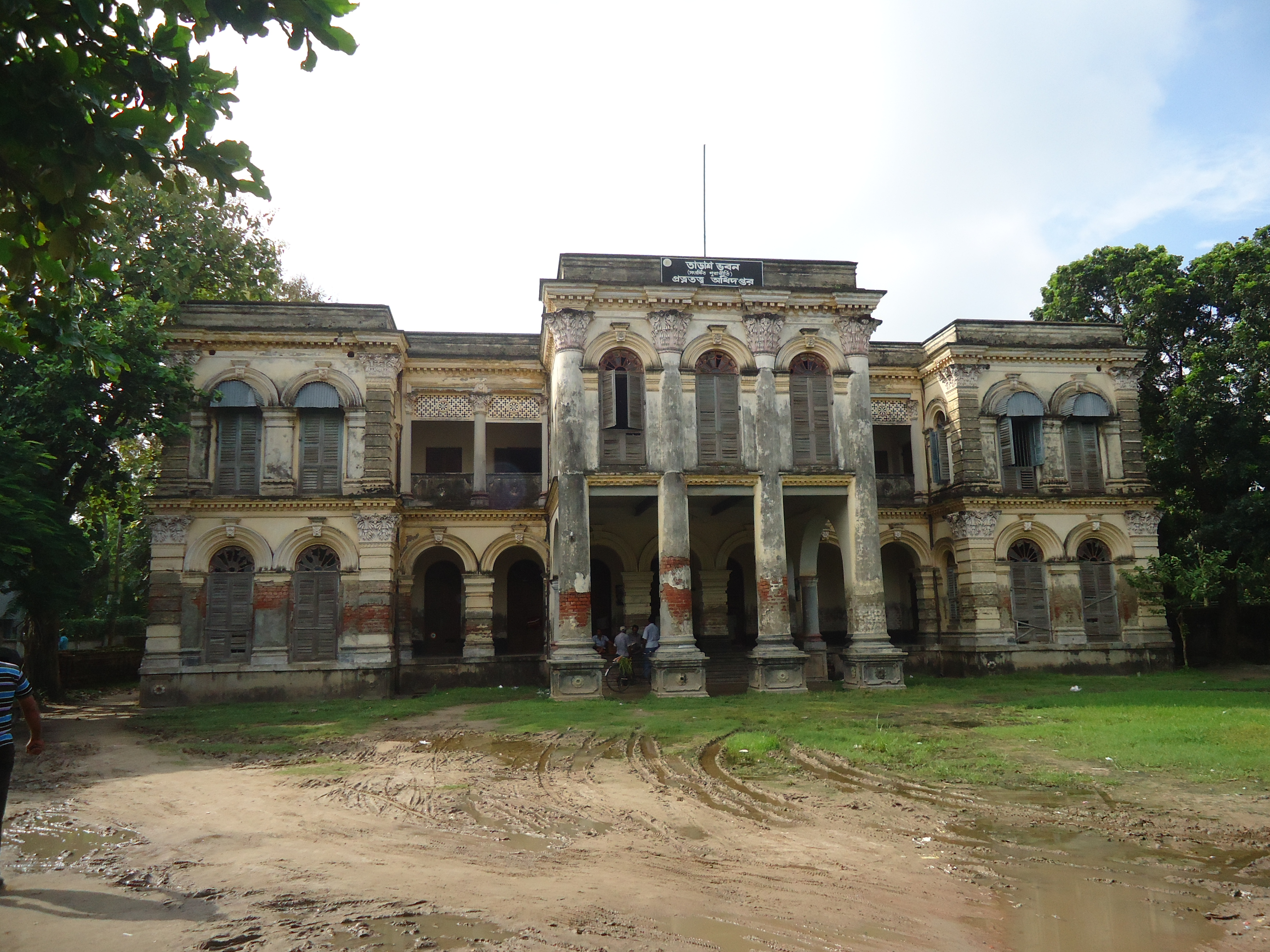
Tarash Bhaban

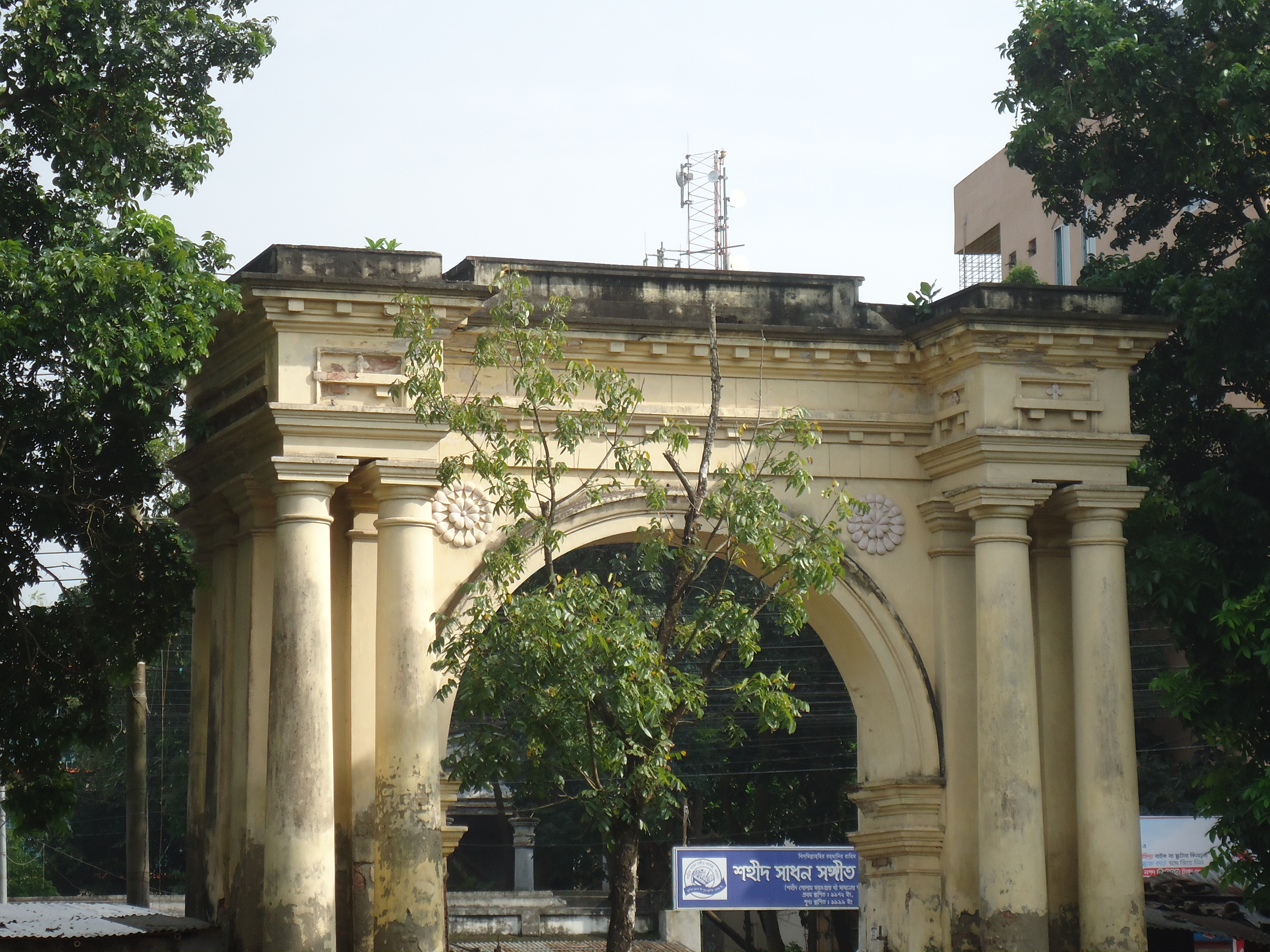
Arcade of Tarash Bhaban

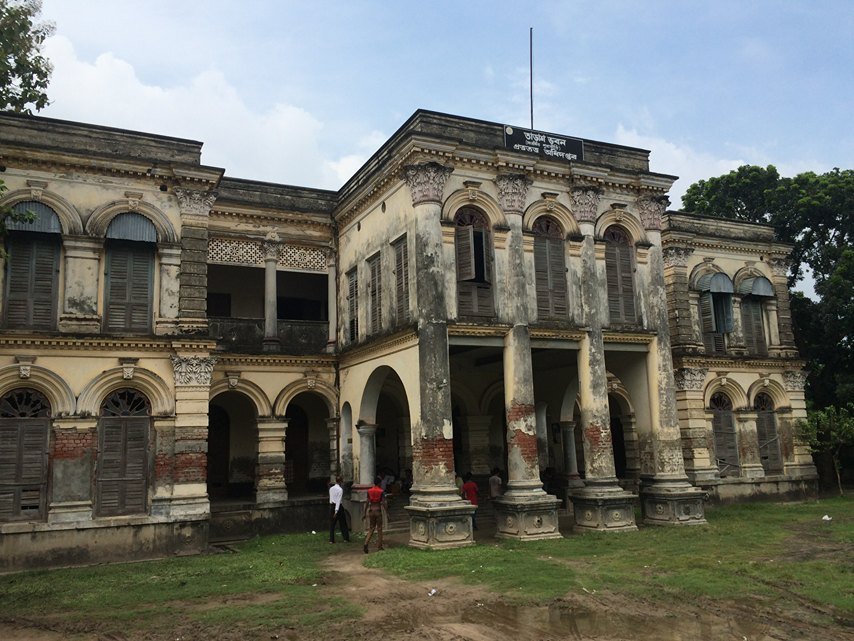
Architectural monument of Tarash Bhaban

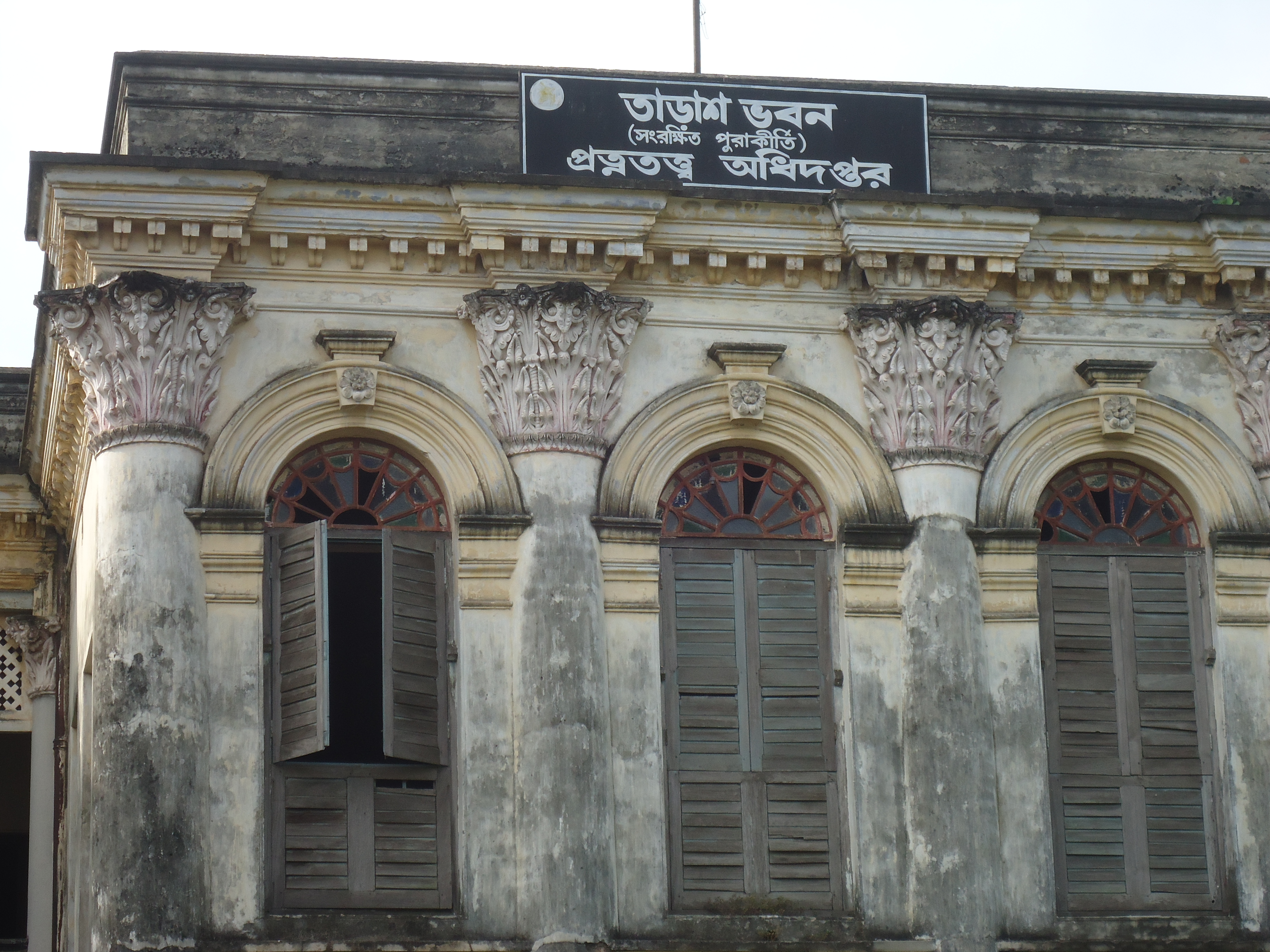
Tarash Bhaban
