= Shreemati Rasasundari =

Bengali writer (1810–1899)

Shreemati Rasasundari (1810–1899) was a 19th-century Bengali writer. She is notable for her autobiography, which provides a rare insight into the life of a 19th-century Bengali housewife.

== Early life ==
Rasasundari was born in March 1810 in Potajia village of Pabna District (now Shajadpur, Sirajganj), Bengal Presidency, East India Company ruled India. She self-educated herself at home, but only to a limited extent. She married Sitanath Sarkar when she was 12 in 1822. Her husband was a Zamidar in Ramdia, Faridpur (now Rajbari District). Her mother-in-law and three widowed sister-in laws lived with them. Her mother-in-law was particularly fond of her.

== Career ==
Rasasundari was a deeply religious women. She had limited literacy. She got her chance to learn when her husband bought a handwritten copy of the religious text Chaitanya Bhagavata. She tried to read from the Chaitanya Bhagavata and using her limited knowledge taught herself how to read at 25. She learned how to write when she was 50, with the support of one of her sons. Her husband, Sitanath Sarkar, died when she was 59, leaving her a widow. She found herself with free time and started writing her autobiography. In 1886 she published her autobiography Amar Jibon (my life). Her autobiography focused on her and her role in the family. She depicts the role of women in Bengali society and how they were bound by their duties to their families through writing about her own life. She wrote about having to eat after making sure everyone in the household had eaten and despite having servants was expected to do household chores. She added more to a second edition of her autobiography which was published in 1898. The book depicted her attempt to shape her life and the intense societal pressures faced by Bengali women.

== Death ==
Rasasundari died in 1899.
