= Pabna Mental Hospital =

Psychiatric hospital in Bangladesh

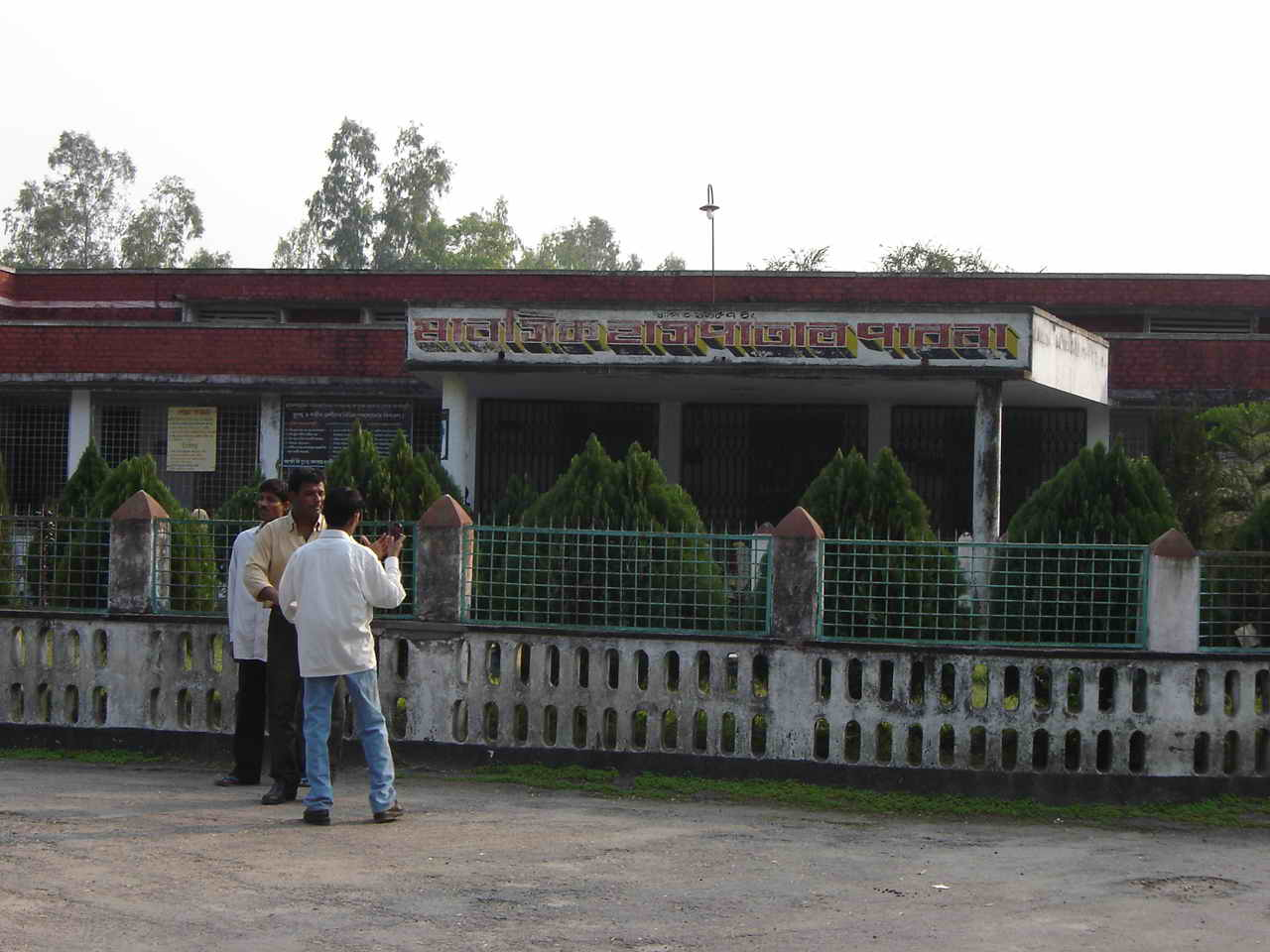
- Main entrance to Pabna Mental Hospital

Geography
- Location: Hemayetpur, Pabna, Rajshahi, Bangladesh
- Coordinates: 24.0022°N 89.2062°E

Organisation
- Type: Psychiatric hospital

Services
- Beds: 500

History
- Founded: 1957

Pabna Mental Hospital is a 500-bed psychiatric hospital located in Hemayetpur, Pabna, Bangladesh. It was the only specialised psychiatric hospital of the region when it was established.

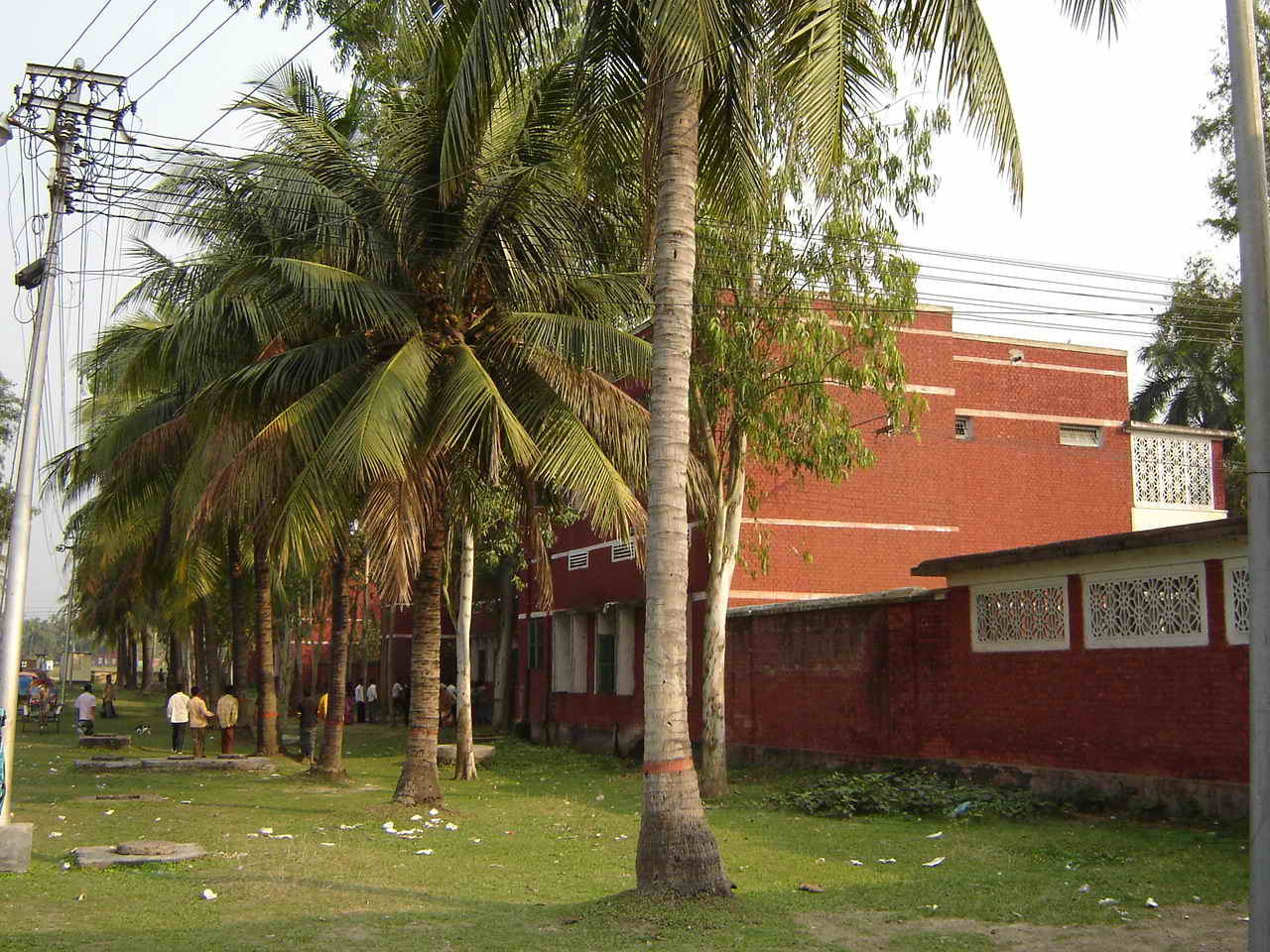
Hospital building

== History ==
The mental hospital was founded by Mohammad Hossain Ganguly in the village Hemayetpur in Pabna District. The Civil Surgeon built the hospital in 1957 at the Shitlai Landlord's palace in the city. After two years, the hospital was relocated. The new location was built on 111.25 acres of acquired land at Hemayetpur village by the hospital authority, which paid compensation to Anukulchandra Chakravarty for the land. The 60-bed hospital has been extended to 90 beds over nine years. The hospital was transformed into a 500-bed psychiatric hospital in 1996, with the addition of an additional 300 beds, many years after the addition of 50 beds.

In July 2020, 22 people in the hospital were infected with COVID-19, and 12 of them were hospital patients. Hospital services were also reduced during the pandemic.

== Specifications ==
The hospital is located on 133.25 acres of government land. There are 19 wards with 14 wards for men and 5 wards for women. The hospital has two storeys. Of the 500 beds in the hospital, 24% are paying beds and 76% are ordinary beds. It has indoor and outdoor facilities. It has a welfare society that helps patients and it is registered with the government.

== Treatment ==
Since the hospital's establishment, it has treated 79,444 patients. Of these, 84% of the patients have been able to leave the hospital.

== Criticisms ==
According to the director and patients of the hospital, there are not enough doctors at the hospital. They criticised that despite brokers encouraging patients to use a different mental hospital, no action has been taken by the hospital authority against the brokers. The director and a ward master of the hospital verified their claim and the director stated that they cannot take action against the brokers. Prothom Alo and Bangladesh Post reported that no action has been taken to recover a portion of the hospital's land that was occupied on 12 March 2017, by Chakraborty's Satsang organisation. The organisation denied the statement and claimed that they bought the land from the government when a part of the organisation protested against the move. The Bangladesh Police asked for proof for their claim, but the organisation has not provided it.

Dhaka Tribune reported that the hospital has no halfway house. Its reporter learned from nurses that many patients are still in the hospital after recovery as a result of being admitted with a fake address. Its supervisor of the occupational therapy centre said that due to a lack of funds, the hospital authorities are having difficulty carrying out occupational therapy and that the sports system on the field is also not suitable. There are allegations against the hospital for neglecting the treatment of patients, reported by Rising BD.

== Future plan ==
The government plans to upgrade the hospital to a modern hospital by constructing a new ten-storey building with more 1500 beds.
