= Amjad Hossain (Kushtia politician) =

Bangladeshi politician

- আমজাদ হোসেন

Member of National Assembly of Pakistan

Personal details
- Born: 21 July 1924 Kumarkhali, Bengal, British India
- Died: 6 April 1971 (aged 46) Pabna, Rajshahi, Bangladesh
- Party: Awami League (1949–1971)
- Other political affiliations: All-India Muslim League (before 1949)
- Education: Maulana Azad College

Amjad Hossain (Bengali: আমজাদ হোসেন; 21 July 1924 – 6 April 1971) was a Bangladeshi statesman and freedom fighter. Amjad Hossain is regarded as one of the influential and political figures in Pabna during Liberation War of Bangladesh in 1971, due to his leadership and organizing capability, he united the various political and civil forces of Bangladeshi nationalism in 1971.

== Early life ==
Amjad Hossain was born in 1924 at Charsadirajpur under PS Kumarkhali District Kushtia, Later his father Sheikh Rafiq Uddin and mother Parijan Nessa permanently settled at Nurpur of Pabna town.

== Education ==
Amjad Hossain started his education from Madrasa. Later he admitted to Pabna Zilla School. He completed his secondary education from Rangpur Carmichael College. Later he graduated from Maulana Azad College, Kolkata.

== Political career ==
Amjad Hossain came in contact with Huseyn Shaheed Suhrawardy when he was student. Shaheed Suhrawardy inspired him to get involved in politics that was how his political career began. He was an organiser of Bengali language movement in 1952 and had a contribution in Language Movement.

When Huseyn Shaheed Suhrawardy became the prime minister of Pakistan he appointed then young Amjad Hossain as his political secretary. For his capability in facing formidable challenges Amjad Hossain earned significant popularity within his party and among the general population. He was elected as member of the National Assembly of Pakistan twice in the years of 1962 and 1970. In the 1970 election he won the election against Maulana Abdus Sobhan.

Amjad Hossain was one of the pioneering architect of Pabna district Awami league. A close confidante of Sheikh Mujibur Rahman, Amjad Hossain shouldered the charges of president of greater Pabna district Awami League in the late 1960s and early 1970s. He coordinated the Awami League's election campaign for the 1970 Pakistani general election in Pabna, in which the League gained a historic parliamentary majority to form government to the elected National Assembly.

== Bangladesh Liberation War ==
Amjad Hossain was a political organiser before Bangladesh Liberation War in 1971. After the Pakistan Army launched Operation Searchlight in East Pakistan in March 1971, he, with other leaders started organizing people. Amjad Hossain, in compliance with directives of Sheikh Mujibur Rahman in his speech on 7 March 1971, framed strategies to fight. He sent a special envoy to the Government of West Bengal seeking military logistics because it seemed the Pakistani political crisis could no longer be solved peacefully.

== Death ==
People's leader Amjad Hossain died on 6 April 1971.

== Post-independence memorial ==
Amjad Hossain High School in Pabna is named after him
