= Pabna Sadar Upazila =

Pabna Sadar পাবনা সদর
- Upazila of Bangladesh
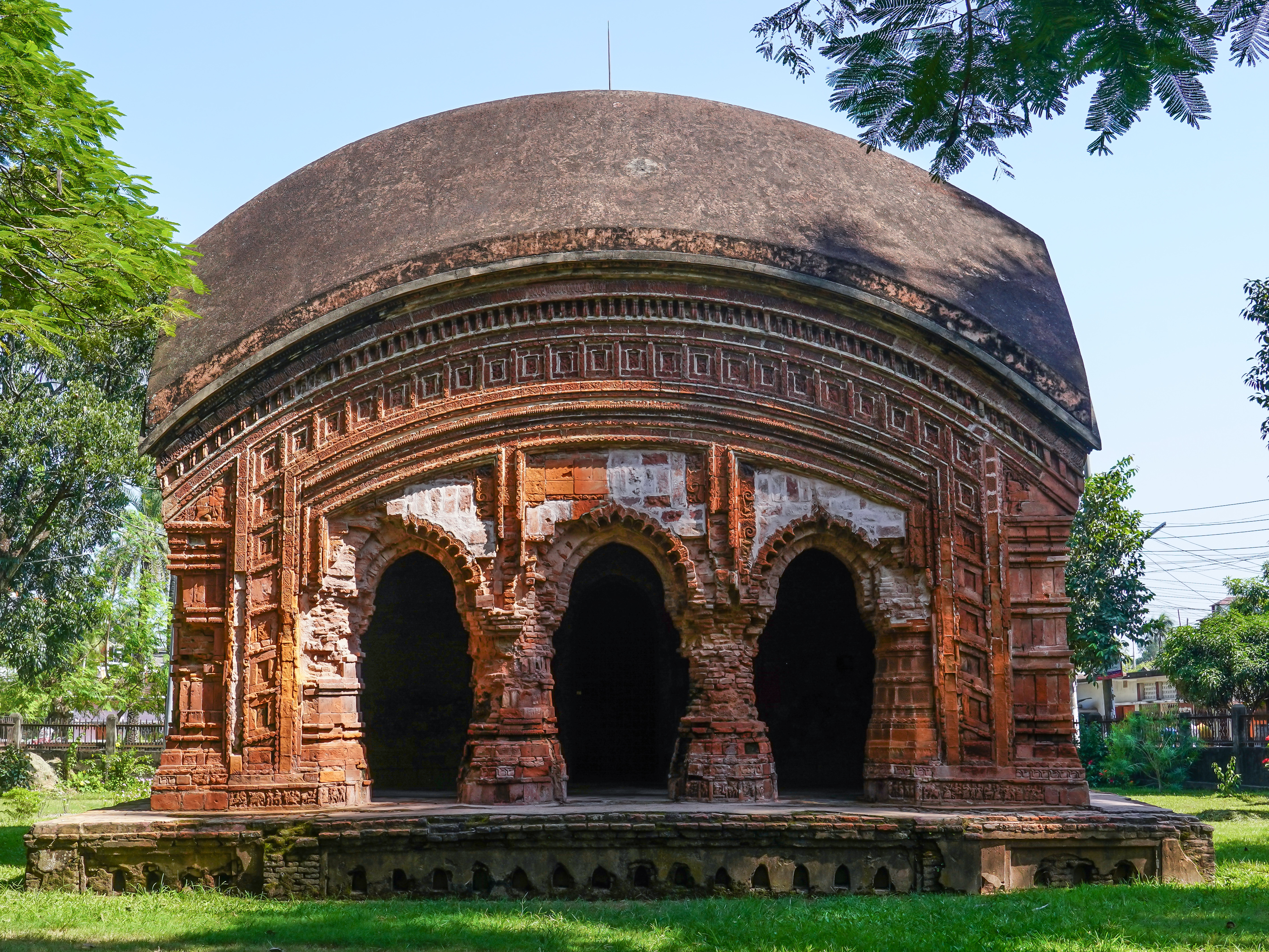
- Gopinath Temple, Pabna

- Coordinates: 24°0.3′N 89°15′E
- Country: Bangladesh
- Division: Rajshahi
- District: Pabna
- Headquarters: Pabna

Area
  - Total: 439.30 km^{2} (169.61 sq mi)

Population (2022)
  - Total: 711,588
  - Density: 1,619.8/km^{2} (4,195.3/sq mi)
- Time zone: UTC+6 (BST)
- Postal code: 6600
- Area code: 0731
- Website: Sadar.gif Official Map of Pabna Sadar

Pabna Sadar Upazila mauza geocode map

Pabna Sadar (Bengali: পাবনা সদর) is an upazila of Pabna District in the Division of Rajshahi, Bangladesh.

== Geography ==
Pabna Sadar is located at 24.0042°N 89.2500°E. It has 74,517 households and the total area is 439.30 km^{2}.

== Demographics ==
Religions in Pabna Sadar Upazila (2022)
Religion	Percent
Islam	98.06%
Hinduism	1.88%
Other or not stated	0.06%

According to the 2022 Bangladeshi census, Pabna Sadar Upazila had 180,910 households and a population of 711,588. 8.99% of the population were under 5 years of age. Pabna Sadar had a literacy rate (age 7 and over) of 72.74%: 72.76% for males and 72.72% for females, and a sex ratio of 101.99 males for every 100 females. 202,048 (28.39%) lived in urban areas.

According to the 2011 Census of Bangladesh, Pabna Sadar Upazila had 138,839 households and a population of 590,914. 127,033 (21.50%) were under 10 years of age. Pabna Sadar had a literacy rate (age 7 and over) of 51.43%, compared to the national average of 51.8%, and a sex ratio of 990 females per 1000 males. 144,442 (24.44%) lived in urban areas.

As of the 1991 Bangladesh census, Pabna Sadar had a population of 431,513. Males constituted 51.76% of the population, and females 48.24%. Pabna Sadar had an average literacy rate of 29.1% (7+ years), and the national average of 32.4% literate.

== Administration ==
Pabna Sadar Upazila is divided into Pabna town and ten union parishads:

- Municipality:
  - Pabna Municipality
- Union
  - Ataikola,
  - Bharara,
  - Char Tarapur,
  - Dapunia,
  - Dogachhi,
  - Gayeshpur,
  - Hemayetpur,
  - Malanchi,
  - Maligachha, and
  - Sadullahpur.

The union parishads are subdivided into 259 mauzas and 291 villages.

Pabna Municipality is subdivided into 15 wards and 46 mahallas.

Chairman: Mosharrof Hossain

Vice Chairman:

Woman Vice Chairman:

Upazila Nirbahi Officer (UNO): Salma Khatun
