= A. K. Khandker =

Bangladeshi independence activist, diplomat and politician (1930–2025)

A. K. Khandker BU
- আব্দুল করিম খন্দকার
- Abdul Karim Khandker

Minister of Planning
- In office 6 January 2009 – 6 January 2014
- Prime Minister: Sheikh Hasina
- Preceded by: Mirza Azizul Islam
- Succeeded by: Mustafa Kamal
- In office 14 September 1986 – 22 March 1990
- Preceded by: Shamsul Haque
- Succeeded by: Mohammad Abdul Munim

Minister of Finance
- In office 28 December 1987 – 22 March 1990
- Preceded by: M Syeduzzaman
- Succeeded by: Mohammad Abdul Munim

Member of Parliament for Pabna-2
- In office December 2008 – 5 January 2014
- Preceded by: AKM Salim Reza Habib
- Succeeded by: Azizul Huq Arzu
- In office September 1998 – July 2001
- Preceded by: Ahmed Tafiz Uddin
- Succeeded by: Selim Reza Habib

High Commissioner to India
- In office 15 July 1982 – 25 July 1986
- President: Abdus Sattar; Ahsanuddin Chowdhury; Hussain Muhammad Ershad
- Preceded by: Abul Ahsan
- Succeeded by: Faruq Ahmed Choudhury

1st Chief of Air Staff
- In office 7 April 1972 – 15 October 1975
- President: Abu Sayeed Chowdhury; Mohammad Mohammadullah; Sheikh Mujibur Rahman; Khondaker Mostaq Ahmad
- Prime Minister: Sheikh Mujibur Rahman; Muhammad Mansur Ali
- Succeeded by: Muhammad Ghulam Tawab

Personal details
- Born: Abdul Karim Khandker; 31 October 1930 Pabna, Bengal Presidency, British India
- Died: 20 December 2025 (aged 95)
- Party: Bangladesh Awami League
- Awards: Bir Uttom
- Nickname: A.K

Military service
- Allegiance: Pakistan (before); Bangladesh
- Branch: Pakistan Air Force; Bangladesh Air Force
- Years of service: 1952–1975
- Rank: Air Vice-Marshal
- Unit: No. 11 Squadron PAF
- Commands: SC − PAFAA; SC − No.11 Squadron; OC − Training (Mukti Bahini); Chief of Air Staff
- Conflict: Bangladesh Liberation War

Abdul Karim Khandker, BU (31 October 1930 – 20 December 2025) was a Bangladeshi military officer and politician who served as the first chief of air staff of the Bangladesh Air Force. He was also the Minister of Planning during the Second Hasina ministry. Khandker served as a diplomat during his service days and was the Deputy Chief of Staff of Mukti Bahini during the Bangladesh Liberation War.

== Early life ==
Abdul Karim Khandker was born under the rule of the British Raj on 31 October 1930 into the Bengali Muslim Khandker family of Pabna, one of the respected families of the town. His father was Abdul Lateef Khandker, and his mother was Arefa Khatun. He completed his matriculation in 1947 and ISC in 1949. He completed his graduation from PAF College in September 1952 and PSA in 1965 from the Pakistan Air Force Staff College.

== Career ==
Khandker started his service career as a GD pilot on 5 January 1951. He was commissioned in the Pakistan Air Force on 27 September 1952. He served in Fighter Squadron till 1955 and became a flying instructor. He was at PAF Academy till 1957 as a flying instructor. He served as flight commander at the Flying Instructors' School till 1958. Later he became flight commander at the Jet Fighter Conversion Squadron, where he served till 1960. He was promoted to the rank of squadron leader in 1960.

Khandker was squadron commander at the Pakistan Air Force Academy till 1961. Afterwards, he became squadron commander of the Jet Fighter Conversion Squadron where he served till 1965. He served as officer commanding of the training wing at PAF Academy in 1966. He became a PSA in 1965 from the Pakistan Air Force Staff College. In 1966 he was promoted to the rank of wing commander. A K Khandker was president of the PAF Planning Board from 1966 to 1969. Later, he was posted at Dhaka as second in command of the PAF Base in 1969. In December 1969, he was promoted to the rank of group captain.

=== Bangladesh Liberation war ===
Khandker was posted at the Pakistan Air Force Base in Dhaka as second-in-command when the Bangladesh Liberation War began in 1971. He defected with Wing Commander Khademul Bashar and several other pilots in May 1971 and reached India. The then Bangladesh government of Mujibnagar appointed him as the deputy chief of staff of the Bangladesh Armed Forces, and he was given the responsibility of operation and also training of the freedom fighters. He closely interacted with the senior officials of the Indian Eastern Command located at Fort William, Kolkata, about training strategies for the Freedom Fighters as well as for overall operation. He established the first-ever Bangladesh Air Force in Dimapur, Nagaland, during the war. The Bangladesh Air Force, with its limited manpower and resources of only 9 officers, 57 airmen, and 3 aircraft, carried out significant numbers of operations against the Pakistani forces. He represented Bangladesh in the surrender ceremony of the Pakistani forces to the allied forces on 16 December 1971 at the Racecourse ground. He received the gallantry award of Bir Uttom in 1972 for his luminous role in the Liberation War.

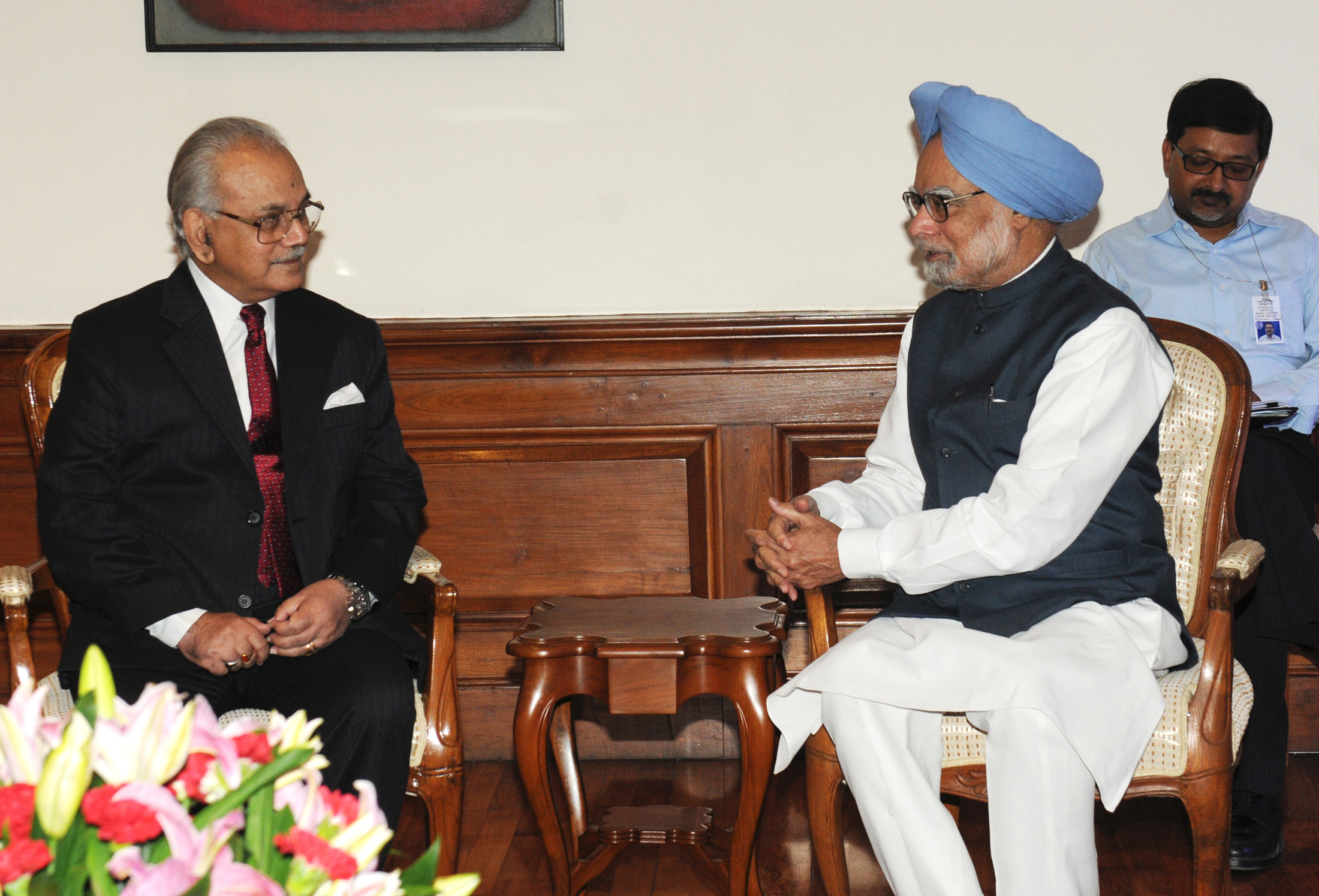
Khandker in a forum with Indian Prime Minister Manmohan Singh at New Delhi on 7 May 2011

=== Post liberation war ===
Following the end of the Bangladesh Liberation War, Sheikh Mujibur Rahman appointed Khandker as the chief of air staff of the reconstituted Air Force. He left a lasting mark in developing the newly constituted air force. Within the next two years, he added a fighter squadron, a helicopter squadron, and 2 radar units to its strength. He served the Bangladesh Air Force as its chief during the period 1972–1975. Apart from serving the Bangladesh Air Force, he was the first chairman of the national carrier Biman Bangladesh from 1972 to 1973.

During the tenure of the immediate past government of 2001–2006, Khandker is credited as the main architect of establishing the "Sector Commanders Forum" by organising sector and sub-sector commanders of the liberation war that waged a strong movement against pro-Jamat and other alleged war criminals. He was awarded the Independence Award for 2011. Khandker was appointed as the Bangladesh high commissioner to Australia and served the mission during 1976–1982. Later on, he became the Bangladesh High Commissioner to India for the period 1982–1986. In 1986, he was appointed as adviser to the president, and thereafter he served the nation as the Planning Minister up to 1990. He was elected as a member of parliament in 1998 and 2009 from the Pabna-2 constituency (Sujanagar Upazila). In 2009, he had been inducted as a full cabinet minister and given the charge of the Ministry of Planning.

== Controversy ==
In 2014, Khandaker wrote his memoirs, 1971 Bhetore Baire (1971: Inside and Outside) and was praised by historian Sirajul Islam, who said that "the book provided a balanced presentation of history and the outline of the war and the interest of different vested groups surrounding the war came up in it." The criticises the role of Awami League leadership during the Liberation, saying that the political leadership had failed to play its due role.

However, it drew fire from the ruling Awami League government, for creating "distorting historic facts" the history of the Bangladesh Liberation War, as he wrote in his book that Sheikh Mujibur Rahman ended his 7 March speech with "Joy Pakistan." He further added that Sheikh Mujib did not declare independence from 7 March until his arrest, did not leave any written notes or recorded voice messages and did not go through any predefined directions. According to him,

In this situation of the country, Bangabandhu announced to give a speech on March 7. The people of the country were waiting to hear what Bangabandhu said. Yahya Khan realized that if Bangabandhu declared independence on March 7, the movement could not be controlled in any way. So he told Bangabandhu, "Don't do anything that takes the situation out of control. I am coming to Dhaka to discuss." On the day of the March 7 speech, the situation inside the cantonment was quite normal, everyone was busy with their work. The speech that Bangabandhu gave that day was very oblique. Inside the cantonment, the Bengalis began to wonder whether the war had really begun, whether we would go to war, or go to the village. I have heard the speech of 7th March. Among the words I liked were: "Build a fortress", "Be ready with whatever you have", "We have to face the enemy", "This time the struggle is the struggle of our freedom, this time the struggle is the struggle for independence. ' At that time people all over Bangladesh were expecting such things from him. Those words were strong but the Awami League leaders did not have any plan to make it a reality. Bangabandhu's speech was significant, but I think he has to figure out how to achieve independence. "Without it, the people need to be prepared to fight. The speech did not give any final direction. After the speech, people started thinking - what will happen next? It is absolutely foolish to talk of starting a war because the Awami League is not prepared." Probably this is the reason why Bangabandhu refrained from declaring independence directly on March 7. Besides, Yahya Khan himself requested Bangabandhu not to make such a declaration. Bangabandhu may have seen the possibility of a political solution in Yahya's presence in Dhaka. I don't think so. The last words of this speech were "Joy Bangla, Joy Pakistan". He called for war and said, "Joy Pakistan"! The call for humility is not highly questionable and indisputable. If the Awami League leaders had a war plan, the people and government, private and military officials could have been properly organized in a short time from the beginning of March. If that was done, I think the war might have ended in a very short time and our victory would have been assured. But sadly, that was not done .... During the liberation war, I used to live in the house next to the house where Prime Minister Tajuddin Ahmed lived on Theater Road towards the end of the liberation war. One day I asked him, "Sir, did you get any instructions from Bangabandhu before he was arrested?" He replied, 'No, I have not received any instructions.' That night Bangabandhu told everyone to hide, but he did not tell anyone where he would go. He did not tell anyone what the leadership of the party would be like if he was arrested. In addition to the meeting between Tajuddin Ahmed and Sheikh Mujib on the evening of March 25, Maidul Hasan, in a discussion between Maidul Hasan, Wing Commander SR Mirza and me on the topic of "Pre-Liberation War: Conversation", said: He did not discuss the decision with anyone at the helm of the party. He did not say who or what would lead if he was not there and for what purpose. Do we have to have a separate committee to lead? What will be their strategy? Will they have a program? No one knew the role of the elders of the party, the role of the youth or the role of the party. During the liberation war, I also asked Tajuddin Ahmed about the incident on the night of March 25. Tajuddin Ahmed admitted that the draft declaration was his own and suggested that Bangabandhu read the draft declaration. The text was probably like this: "The Pakistani army attacked us suddenly. They have started repression everywhere. In this situation, everyone has to jump into the freedom struggle of our country and I declared the independence of Bangladesh. "Mr. Tajuddin further said that after giving the draft declaration to Sheikh Mujibur Rahman, he did not read it and remained unanswered. Tajuddin Ahmed said to Bangabandhu, "Brother Mujib, you have to tell this. Because what will happen tomorrow, if all of us are arrested? Then no one will know what we have to do. If this announcement is kept in a secret place later "We can broadcast the announcement. If anything can be done through radio, it will be done." Bangabandhu then replied, "It will be a document against me. For this the Pakistanis will be able to try me for treason." Tajuddin Ahmed was very angry at this and left Dhanmondi No. 32 after 9 pm. Later, Maidul Hasan asked the Awami League's publicity secretary Abdul Momin about this. He was also present at Bangabandhu's house on the night of March 25. Abdul Momin said that when he was entering Bangabandhu's house, he saw Tajuddin Ahmed carrying files in his armpit with a very angry look. Abdul Momin took Tajuddin's hand and asked, "Why are you angry? Then Tajuddin Ahmed narrated the previous incident to him and said, 'Bangabandhu is not willing to take any risk. But one-after-one attacks are coming on us.'

Khandker also added that, not Ziaur Rahman, but a technician of the East Bengal radio station first announced the declaration on the radio. Then M. A. Hannan, a politician of Awami League, secondly expressed the announcement. Thirdly, on 27 March, Major Ziaur Rahman, the contemporary commander of the East Bengal Regiment in Chittagong again declared the independence announcement on behalf of Sheikh Mujibur Rahman from Kalurghat Radio station.

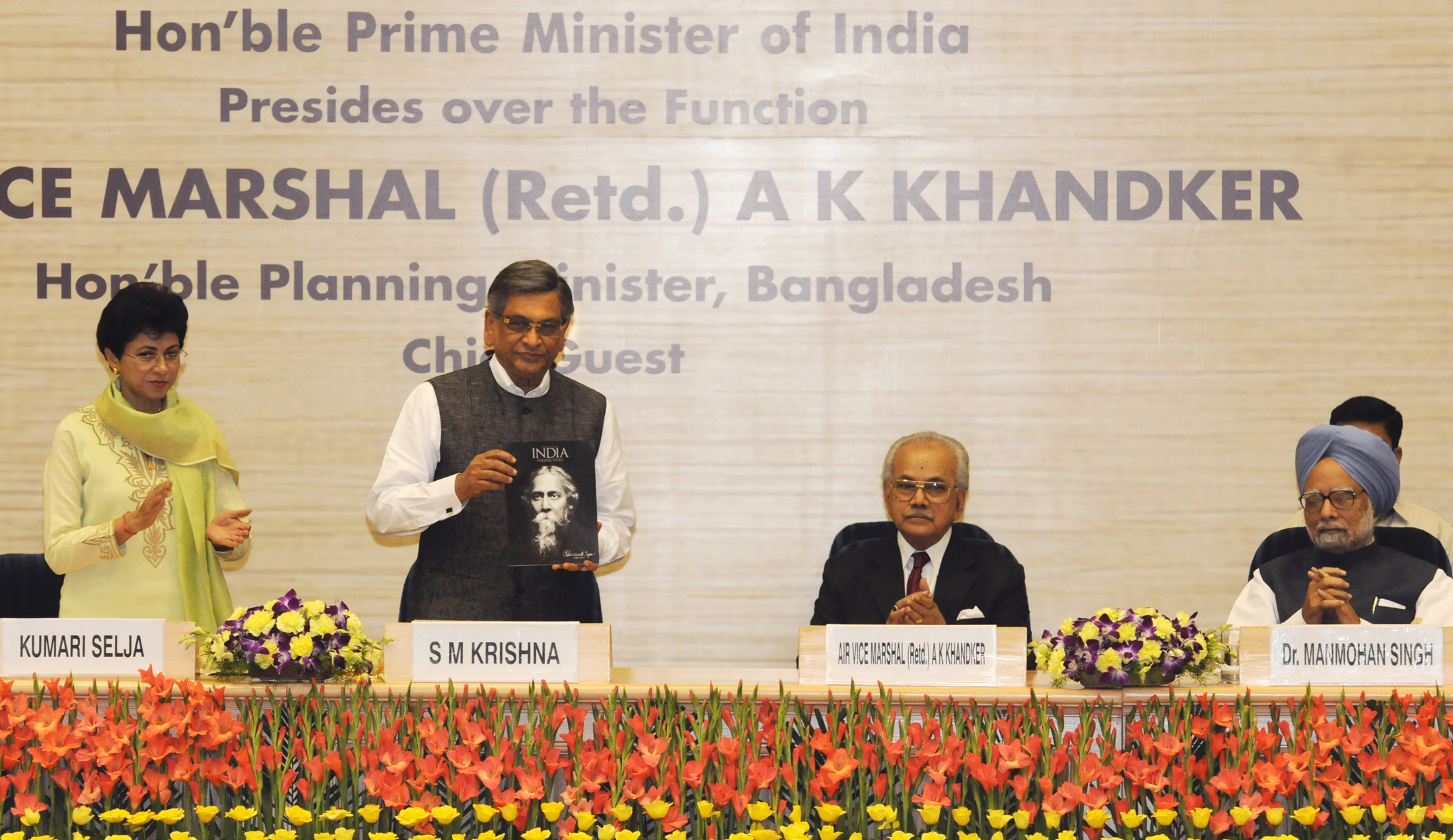
Khandker with 23rd Indian Ministry at the inaugural function of 150th Birth Anniversary commemorations of Rabindranath Tagore, at New Delhi on 7 May 2011

An uproar in parliament ensued where Awami League lawmakers demanded that the book must be banned and its copies will be confiscated. They also demanded filing a sedition case against the writer, who is also a sector commander of the liberation war. Awami League lawmaker Sheikh Fazlul Karim Selim said that the book "has distorted historic facts and violated the country's constitution by giving such misleading information on Bangabandhu.""I am in doubt whether he wrote the book by taking huge amount of money from any agency," he added. Mohammed Nasim said "Bangabandhu Sheikh Mujibur Rahman awarded AK Khandaker with the Bir Uttam honours but he (Khandaker) insulted the father of the nation by extending his support to Khondaker Mostaq Ahmad. Prime Minister Sheikh Hasina made him a minister but now he wrote a book against Bangabandhu."

In response, Khandaker resigned from the Sector Commanders Forum. He was then declared persona non grata in the district of Gazipur and pro-government lawyers demanded withdrawal of all of his titles. As a result of the uproar, he withdrew that part and some other related parts of the book and also formally apologized to the nation for giving wrong information about Sheikh Mujib on 11 August 2019.

== Illness and death ==
Abdul Karim Khandker was admitted to Combined Military Hospital (Dhaka) on 7 December 2025 and died from old age complications on 20 December 2025 at the age of 95.

His funeral prayers (namaz-e-janaza) and state funeral parade were held at the BAF Base Bashar Parade Ground (National Parade Ground) in Tejgaon, Dhaka. He was buried at the Shaheen Graveyard with state honors.

== Awards and decorations ==

Bir Uttom (Great Valiant Hero)	Sitara-e-Harb 1965 War (War Star 1965)	Tamgha-e-Jang 1965 War (War Medal 1965)	Tamgha-e-Jamhuria (Republic Commemoration Medal) 1956

== Legacy ==
BAF Base Bir Uttom A. K. Khandker was named after him in 2025.
