= Haramoni =

Collection of Bengali folksongs

Haramoni is the title of 13-volume collection of Bengali folksongs by Muhammed Mansooruddin. Mansooruddin collected more than 5,000 folksongs from different parts of Bengal. He compiled them in a series of volumes and the titled them after the name of a regular section of monthly literary magazine Probashi that was earmarked for publishing folk songs collected from rural areas. Haramoni literally means Lost Jewels.

== History of publication ==
The first volume of Haramoni essentially an anthology of Baul songs, was published in 1931 (95 years ago). Mansooruddin himself published this volume which was printed by Karim Box Brothers. Nobel Laureate poet Rabindranath Tagore wrote the preface of the book when its first volume was published. In 1942, the second volume was published by the Calcutta University. In 1948, Mansooruddin took initiative to publish the third volume of Haramoni. The University of Dhaka published the fourth volume in 1959. The manuscript contained 400 songs and as many as 300 of them got lost. The fourth volume contained many songs of Pagla Kanai. The fifth volume was edited by Professor Muhammad Abdul Hye and published by the Department of Bengali, Dhaka University, in 1961. It contained many songs of Lalon Fakir and Pagla Kanai. Again it is Mansooruddin who at his own initiative published the sixth volume of Haramoni in 1967. However, by then Bangla Academy had published the seventh volume in 1964. The sixth volume contained nearly two hundred songs of Lalon Fakir. The seventh contained about seven hundred songs many of which were collected from Sylhet area. Also there was some of Panjeri Shah or Panju Shah. Mansooruddin added an 84 pages long introduction to this volume that focused on the life of Hason Raja, Panju Shah, Shitalansha Shah, Arkum Shah, Monomhon, Radharaman, Dwija Das, Sheikh Bhanu, Qurban, Abdul Jabber, Madan Ganbi, Shah Mohammad Yasin, Ram Gopal, Kala Chand Pagla, Ananta Goshai and Abdul Wahed, among others. The eighth volume contained more than eight hundred songs collected from Kushtia, Faridpur, Pabna and Dhaka. It was published in 1976. It is the Bangla Academy that published the ninth volume in 1988. However, the tenth volume was already published in 1984. The 13th volume was published in 1984 by the Bangladesh Folklore Parishad. As many as eight more volumes remain to be published by the Bangla Academy, Dhaka.

== Contents ==
Apart from Baul songs, Haramoni contains a huge number of rural songs of different categories like Meyeli gaan, Baro maishya and Deha Tatwa. One of the songs of Lalon Fakir, as sung by Premdasa Bairagi, appears in Haramoni as follows:

মন আমার কি ছার গৌরব করছো ভবে!
দেখ না রে সব হাওয়ার খেলা,
হাওয়া বন্ধ হতে দেরী কি হবে?

থাকতে হাওয়ার হাওয়াখানা
মওলা বলে ডাক রসনা
মহাকাল বসেছে রানায়
কখন যেন কু ঘটাবে।

বন্ধ হলে এ হাওয়াটী,
মাটীর দেহ হবে মাটী
দেখে শুনে হওনা খাঁটী
মন! কে তোরে কত বুঝাবে॥

ভবে আসার আগে যখন,
বলেছিলে কর্ম সাধন
লালন বলে সে কথা মন,
ভুলেছো এই ভবের লোভে॥
