= Government Bhangura Union High School and College =

Government Bhangura Union High School and College সরকারি ভাঙ্গুড়া ইউনিয়ন উচ্চ বিদ্যালয় ও কলেজ

Location
- Bhangura Upazila; Bangladesh
- Coordinates: 24.2168°N 89.3774°E

Information
- Type: Public higher secondary school

Government Bhangura Union High School and College (Bengali: সরকারি ভাঙ্গুড়া ইউনিয়ন উচ্চ বিদ্যালয় ও কলেজ) is a higher secondary school in Bhangura town, the headquarters of Bhangura Upazila, Bangladesh.

It was founded in Parshodangla of what is now Chatmohar Upazila in 1926. It shifted to the current location in 1938 and upgraded as a secondary school, so 1938 is considered as the year of establishment. It is the oldest secondary school in Bhangura Upazila. Previously it was called Bhangura Union Multilateral Boy's High School. It has also been spelt Bhangoora Union High School.

The school was elevated to higher secondary level in 2015, becoming Bhangura Union High School and College. It was nationalized on 4 February 2019, when it assumed its current name.

== Notable alumni ==
- M Hossain Ali, first Bangladeshi ambassador to the United States
