= Muhammad Mansuruddin =

- Born: 31 January 1904; Muraripur Village, Sujanagar thana, Pabna District, Bengal Presidency, British India
- Died: 19 September 1987 (aged 83); Dhaka, Bangladesh
- Occupations: Teacher, writer, folklorist
- Writing career
- Period: Bengal Renaissance
- Genres: folklore, novel, short story, essay, biography, lexicography
- Notable work: Haramoni
- Notable awards: Ekushey Padak; Independence Day Award

Muhammad Mansuruddin (31 January 1904 – 19 September 1987) was a Bengali author, literary critic, essayist, lexicographer and biographer from Bangladesh. He was an authority on folklore and was famous for a huge collection of age-old folk songs, mostly anthologised in thirteen volumes under the title Haramoni. In recognition of his lifelong contribution to folklore collection and research, the Rabindra Bharati University awarded him D.Litt. degree in 1987.

== Early life and education ==
On 31 January 1904 Mansuruddin was born to Muhammad Jaider Ali (father) and Jiarun Nisa (mother) in the Muraripur village under Sujanagar thana of Pabna district of East Bengal of the British India, now in Bangladesh. His education started in a rural school called Madhabchandra Nandi Pathshala. He matriculated from the Khalilpur High School in 1921. He did ISc from the Pabna Edward College in 1923 and then IA from the Rajshahi College in 1924, both IA and ISc being equivalent to HSC. He obtained his bachelor's degree (BA) from Rajshahi College in 1926. He studied in the department of Indian Vernacular of the Calcutta University, from where he secured an M. A. (Master of Arts) with a First Class in 1928. While a student of the Rajshahi College, he was married to Sharifun Nisa in 1925. They had six sons and six daughters.

== Teaching career ==
In 1929, he joined government service as a school sub-inspector. While posted in Naogaon, he came to meet with Annadashankar Roy, who was then the sub-divisional officer (SDO). His career as a teacher commenced in 1932 when he joined the Dhaka Islamic Intermediate College to teach English language and literature. From 1935 to 1938, he taught at the Howrah Intermediate College, Calcutta. From 1938 to 1941, he taught Bengali language and literature in the Chittagong College. Then he joined the Rajshahi College and taught from 1941 to 1943. He was a professor of Bengali language and literature at the Murray Chand College in Sylhet from 1948 to 1952. Mansuruddin taught at the Dhaka College since 1952 from where he retired in 1959. During the same time, he taught in the Bengali Department of the Dhaka University as a part-time faculty-member. Also, he served for some time as an instructor at the Police Academy, Sardah. As a teacher he was very interesting and attractive to his pupils.

== Literary career ==
Mansuruddin started to write at a very early stage. Although the collection of folklore remains his greatest legacy, he wrote literary essays and fiction all through his life. His most notable literary contribution is, however, the collection of over six thousand folk songs from different rural areas of Bengal. In 1952, he worked as editor of monthly literary Mah-e Now for about six months (on deputation from government service).

He spent fifty to sixty years collecting Baul songs and other rural songs. He transcribed without caring for lexical accuracy. He took down as he heard from the mouth of the singers. He collected a huge number of folklore poems and songs, many of which were collected in thirteen volumes during his lifetime. He also collected songs of Lalon Fakir and wrote on him. Also, in 1974, he translated some songs of Lalon Fakir for the international audience. He often encouraged younger folklorists to research following internationally recognised scientific conventions. At the same time, he advised folklore researchers to travel to the rural sources of the folklore items to discover the life behind it.

== Important works ==
Apart from Haramoni ('হারামণি'), his notable collection was Lalon Fakir-er Gaan ('লালন ফকিরের গান' : Songs of Lalan Fakir), published in 1948. Lalan Geetika ('লালন গীতিকা') was published subsequently. Folksongs of Lalan Shah in English rendering was published in 1974. Introductions to different volumes of Haramoni are revealing and educative. In the Introduction of Volume V of Haramoni, he wrote, "No contemporary poet was to be compared with Lalon. The song of Lalon Shah bears the quaking of life and delightful reason why the rural indigent people preserve it. This song quenches the spiritual musical thirst, in fact, though Lalon is illiterate but his songs are full of refulgent. The language of Shah is more glorious than Dasharoti Ray, Modhu Kanan even than the language of Ram Prasad-No other his contemporary Muslim poet can be compared with him, even the poem of great litterateur Meer Mosharraf Hossain is worse than that of Lalon". A collection of Vaishnab Kabita was published in 1942. He wrote two novels, which were First July ('পহেলা জুলাই') (1932) and Satashey March ('সাতাশে মার্চ') (1958). He produced three volumes of folktales, namely, Shirni (1932), Agar baati (1935) and Shiropa (1938). He published a translation of Aurangzeb in 1940. His essays were published in several volumes. These included Dhaner Manjari (1933) and Kabya Samput (1948). His notable work, Muslim Contribution in Bengali Literature, was published in 3 volumes between 1960 and 1981. Other prose works are Conflict between the Hindus and the Mussalmans (1981) and Vaishnab Kabita by Muslim composers (1942). Muhammad Monsooruddin, another prominent folklorist of Bangladesh, took up the task of collecting Baul songs, which had been started by Tagore. After the publication of the first volume (1939) with preface from Rabindranath Tagore, in 1942, Calcutta University published his second volume of Hara-Mani (Lost Gems), which included a few hundred songs. Since then, 12 additional volumes of his collections have been published in Dacca. Jassim Uddin, who started his career as a collections of folksongs and folktales. He was, however, most famous for his use of folklore themes in dramas and in poetry. His published folksong collections include Rangila Nayer Majhi (The Boatman of the Green Boat) in 1938. His collection of humorous folktales, published in Bengali as Bangalir Hashir Galpa (1960) appeared along with English translation. He also published Jarigan (1968) and many other publications. Special mention should be made of Late Abbas Uddin, a scholar, accomplished singer, and collector of folksongs. His influence in the contemporary folklore movement of our country is immense. Hundreds of his genuine folksong records pressed by commercial recording companies sold like hot cakes. Popularly known as the father of Bengali Folk-songs, Abbas Uddin has made folksongs popular and has created a school of folksingers in Bangladesh. These three scholars, Muhammad Monsooruddin, Jassim Uddin and Abbas Uddin, represented the country at Folklore Conferences held in London, at Indian a university in Bloomington and the Germany, in past years.

He wrote several biography books including Iraner Kobi (1968), a biography of Muhammad titled Hazrat Muhammader Jiboni O Sadhona, Hazrat Shah Waliullah and Harun Rashid. His books for children included Bokami (1952), Thokami (1958) and Mushkil Ahsan (1958). He compiled a dictionary of Bengali idioms under the title Hashir Ovidhan in 1957.

He is one of the pioneers of Bengali folklore collection and research. Owing to rural origin, he was aware of folklore ballads and songs of oral tradition. He was impressed by the richness of Bengali folk music and decided to collect them before they are fully lost into oblivion. Starting from 1920s, he travelled from place to place and met people to collect folk songs that spread through oral medium. For Haramoni, he visited hundreds of villages of Rajshahi, Pabna, Nadia, Murshidabad, Mymensingh, Faridpur, Barisal, Noakhali and Dhaka. He was encouraged by the works of Rabindranath Tagore, Kshitimohan Sen, Pallikobi Jasimuddin, singer Abbas Uddin and painter Zainul Abedin. He was inspired when his collection of a song of Lalon Fakir sung by Premdasa Bairagi was published in the Haramoni section of the monthly literary magazine Probashi. It is quoted below.

=== Haramoni ===
Haramoni was the name of a regular section of monthly literary magazine Probashi that was dedicated to publishing folk songs collected from rural areas. Mansoor uddin picked up this name for publishing his collection of folklore. The first volume of Haramoni (Lost Jewels in English translation), essentially an anthology of Baul songs, was published in 1931. Mansuruddin himself published this volume, which was printed by Karim Box Brothers. Nobel Laureate poet Rabindranath Tagore wrote the preface of the book when its first volume was published. In 1942, the second volume was published by the Calcutta University. In 1948, Mansuruddin took initiative to publish the third volume of Haramoni. The University of Dhaka published the fourth volume in 1959. The manuscript contained 400 songs, and as many as 300 of them got lost. The fourth volume contained many songs of Pagla Kanai. The fifth volume was edited by Muhammad Abdul Hye and published by the Department of Bengali, Dhaka University, in 1961. It contained many songs by Lalon Fakir and Pagla Kanai. Again it is Mansoor uddin who at his own initiative published the sixth volume of Haramoni in 1967. However, by then, the Bangla Academy had published the seventh volume in 1964. The sixth volume contained nearly two hundred songs of Lalon Fakir. The seventh contained about seven hundred songs, many of which were collected from Sylhet area. Also, there was some of Panjeri Shah or Panju Shah. Mansuruddin added an 84 pages long introduction to this volume that focused on the lives of Hason Raja, Panju Shah, Shitalansha Shah, Arkum Shah, Monomhon, Radharaman, Dwija Das, Sheikh Bhanu, Qurban, Abdul Jabber, Madan Ganbi, Shah Mohammad Yasin, Ram Gopal, Kala Chand Pagla, Ananta Goshai and Abdul Wahed, among others. The eighth volume contained more than eight hundred songs collected from Kushtia, Faridpur, Pabna and Dhaka. It was published in 1976. It is the Bangla Academy that published the ninth volume in 1988. However, the tenth volume was already published in 1984. The 13th volume was published in 1984 by the Bangladesh Folklore Parishad. As many as eight more volumes remain to be published by the Bangla Academy, Dhaka. Apart from Baul songs, Haramoni contains a huge number of rural songs of different categories like Meyeli gaan, Baro maishya and Deha Tatwa.

- Shirni (1931)
- Dhaner Mavjari (1933)
- Agarbati (1938)
- Bangla Sahitye Muslim Sadhana (1960–1966)
- Iraner Kavi (1968)

== Awards ==
In 1987 Rabindra Bharati University, Kolkata, India awarded him D.Litt. (Doctor of Letters) honoris causa for his lifelong contribution to folklore collection and research. He received many other awards during his lifetime including the following:

- Sir Ashutosh Mukherjee Award, Calcutta University, (1926)
- Bangla Academy Literary Award (1965)
- Muktodhara Sahitya Puroshker (1982)
- Alokto Sahitya Puroshker (1983)
- Independence Day Award (1984)
- Khoda Boks Puroshker
- Kalu Shah Puroshker (1986)
- Sher-e-Bangla National Award and Gold Medal (1980)
- Ekushey Padak (1983)
- Nasiruddin Gold Medal (1983)

== Important notes ==
- Annadashankar Roy dedicated his Lalan and His Songs (1978) to Muhammad Mansuruddin.
- Also Sanatkumer Mitra dedicated his Lalan Faquir, Kobi and Kabya (1979) to Mansuruddin.

== Bibliography ==
- Tofael Ahmed: Bangladesher Atmaar Sondhaney Sahitya Acharjya('আত্মার সন্ধানে সাহিত্য আচার্য্য'), Dhaka, 1983.
- Momen Chowdhury: Muhammad Mansururddin ('মুহম্মদ মনসুরউদ্দীন'), Dhaka, 1988.
- Lekhak Ovidhan ('লেখক অভিধান'), Bangla Academy, 1999.
