= AKM Shamsuddin =

Bangladeshi politician

Member of Bangladesh Parliament
- In office 1988–1991
- Preceded by: Wazi Uddin Khan
- Succeeded by: Saiful Azam

Personal details
- Party: Jatiya Party (Ershad)

AKM Shamsuddin is a Jatiya Party (Ershad) politician in Bangladesh and a former member of parliament for Pabna-3.

== Career ==
Shamsuddin was elected to parliament from Pabna-3 as a Jatiya Party candidate in 1988.
