= Pabna-3 =

Bangladeshi parliamentary constituency

Coordinates: 24.23°N 89.29°E

- Constituency for the Jatiya Sangsad
- District: Pabna District
- Division: Rajshahi Division
- Electorate: 402,836 (2018)

Current constituency
- Created: 1973
- Party: Bangladesh Jamaat-e-Islami
- Member: Muhammad Ali Asgar
- ← 69 Pabna-2 71 Pabna-4 →

Pabna-3 is a constituency represented in the Jatiya Sangsad (National Parliament) of Bangladesh since 2026 by Muhammad Ali Asgar of the Bangladesh Jamaat-e-Islami.

== Boundaries ==
The constituency encompasses Bhangura, Chatmohar, and Faridpur upazilas.

== History ==
The constituency was created for the first general elections in newly independent Bangladesh, held in 1973.

== Members of Parliament ==
Election	Member	Party
1973	Raushanul Haque Moti Mia	Awami League
1979	Jamshed Ali	Bangladesh Nationalist Party
Major Boundary Changes
1986	Wazi Uddin Khan	Awami League
1988	AKM Shamsuddin	Jatiya Party
1991	Saiful Azam	Bangladesh Nationalist Party
Jun 1996	Wazi Uddin Khan	Awami League
2001	K. M. Anowarul Islam	Bangladesh Nationalist Party
2008	Mokbul Hossain	Awami League

== Elections ==
=== Elections in the 2010s ===
General Election 2014: Pabna-3
Party	Candidate	Votes	%	±%
AL	Mokbul Hossain	100,496	87.4	+27.0
Independent	Abul Kalam Azad	12,673	11.0	N/A
Ganatantri Party	Md. Khairul Alam	1,819	1.6	N/A
Majority		87,823	76.4	+54.9
Turnout		114,988	31.9	−59.3
AL hold				

=== Elections in the 2000s ===
General Election 2008: Pabna-3
Party	Candidate	Votes	%	±%
AL	Mokbul Hossain	178,975	60.4	+13.0
BNP	Saiful Azam	115,190	38.9	−13.0
Zaker Party	Asaduzzaman	1,580	0.5	N/A
Ganatantri Party	Md. Khairul Alam	343	0.1	N/A
BJP	Mir Nadim Mohammad Dablu	154	0.1	N/A
Majority		63,784	21.5	+17.0
Turnout		296,241	91.2	+7.0
AL gain from BNP				

General Election 2001: Pabna-3
Party	Candidate	Votes	%	±%
BNP	K. M. Anwarul Islam	131,294	51.9	+13.5
AL	Mokbul Hossain	119,794	47.4	+1.3
IJOF	Abdus Sattar	1,727	0.7	N/A
Majority		11,500	4.5	−3.1
Turnout		252,815	84.2	+0.5
BNP gain from AL				

=== Elections in the 1990s ===
General Election June 1996: Pabna-3
Party	Candidate	Votes	%	±%
AL	Md. Waziuddin Khan	85,644	46.1	+7.7
BNP	K. M. Anwarul Islam	71,435	38.4	−16.1
Jamaat	Md. Afzal Hossain	14,936	8.0	N/A
JP(E)	Sayed Md. Abdur Rahim	10,752	5.8	+4.1
WPB	Md. K.M. Ataur Rahman	1,469	0.8	N/A
Zaker Party	Asaduzzaman	973	0.5	−1.4
Gano Forum	Abdus Sattar	665	0.4	N/A
Majority		14,209	7.6	−8.5
Turnout		185,874	83.7	+15.2
AL gain from BNP				

General Election 1991: Pabna-3
Party	Candidate	Votes	%	±%
BNP	Saiful Azam	91,540	54.5	
AL	Md. Waziuddin Khan	64,523	38.4	
IOJ	Md. Korban Ali	5,060	3.0	
Zaker Party	Asaduzzaman	3,185	1.9	
JP(E)	AKM Shamsuddin	2,933	1.7	
Jatiya Samajtantrik Dal-JSD	Md. Shahidullah	361	0.2	
NAP (Muzaffar)	Md. Abul Kashem Fazlul Haq	195	0.1	
BAKSAL	Md. Shah Alam	146	0.1	
Majority		27,017	16.1	
Turnout		167,943	68.5	
BNP gain from JP(E)				
