= Saiful Azam =

Former Pakistani and Bangladeshi fighter pilot

Group Captain Saiful Azam SJ SBt
- সাইফুল আজম

Member of Parliament
- In office 20 March 1991 – 30 March 1996
- Preceded by: AKM Shamsuddin
- Succeeded by: Wazi Uddin Khan
- Constituency: Pabna-3

Chairman of Civil Aviation Authority of Bangladesh
- In office 15 September 1987 – 24 May 1988
- Prime Minister: Mizanur Rahman Chowdhury; Moudud Ahmed
- Preceded by: M Shaukat-ul Islam
- Succeeded by: Moinul Islam
- In office 6 September 1982 – 3 September 1984
- Prime Minister: Ataur Rahman Khan
- Succeeded by: M Shaukat-ul Islam

Personal details
- Born: 11 September 1941 Faridpur, Bengal Presidency, British India
- Died: 14 June 2020 (aged 78) CMH, Dhaka Division, Bangladesh
- Resting place: Dhaka Cantonment, Dhaka Division, Bangladesh
- Citizenship: Bangladesh, Pakistan (till 1971)
- Party: Bangladesh Nationalist Party
- Education: Pakistan Air Force Academy
- Awards: Sitara-e-Jurat and Sitara-e-Basalat by Pakistan; Wisam al-Istiqlal by Jordan; Nawt as-Shaja'ah (by Iraq in 2005)

Military service
- Allegiance: Pakistan; (1960–1971); Bangladesh (1971–1980)
- Branch/service: Pakistan Air Force; Royal Jordanian Air Force; (Six-Day War); Iraqi Air Force; (Six-Day War); Bangladesh Air Force
- Years of service: 1960–1977
- Rank: Group Captain
- Unit: No. 17 Squadron
- Commands: Chairman of Civil Aviation Authority of Bangladesh; ACAS (Administration) at Air Headquarters; Director (Training) at Air Headquarters; Base Commander of BAF Base Tejgaon
- Battles/wars: Indo-Pakistani War of 1965; Six-Day War; Bangladesh Liberation War

Saiful Azam (Bengali: সাইফুল আজম; 11 September 1941 – 14 June 2020) was a Bangladeshi fighter pilot and flying ace, and politician. He first served as a fighter pilot for the Pakistan Air Force (PAF) and later the Bangladesh Air Force (BAF). According to Pakistani sources, during his career as a PAF pilot, he allegedly shot down one Indian Air Force aircraft in the 1965 Indo-Pakistani War, where he served as a military advisor and pilot for the air forces of Jordan and Iraq.

For his actions, he received various gallantry awards from Pakistan, Jordan and Iraq.He also took part in 12 ground-attack missions against the Indian Armed Forces. After the independence of Bangladesh, he joined the newly formed Bangladesh Air Force.

In 1978, Azam retired as a group captain from the Bangladesh Air Force. After retiring from the military, Azam continued government service on contract basis and started his own private trading firm. Azam was a one term parliament member (1991–1996) representing his hometown seat of Pabna from Bangladesh Nationalist Party (BNP). He died on 14 June 2020 at Combined Military Hospital, Dhaka Cantonment.

== Early life and education ==
Azam was born on 1 September 1941 to a Bengali Muslim family in the village of Khalishadah-Khagarbaria of Faridpur subdivision in Pabna District of then Bengal Presidency (now in Rajshahi Division, Bangladesh). His father, Nurul Amin, worked in Calcutta where Azam spent much of his childhood up until the Partition of Bengal in 1947. After completing his secondary schooling in East Pakistan, he moved to West Pakistan and joined the Pakistan Air Force College in Sargodha. After that, he joined Pakistan Air Force Academy, Risalpur in 1958, successfully gaining commission as an officer in the PAF's General Duties Pilot or GD (P) branch in 1960. Saiful Azam was married to Nishat Azam, a lawyer.

== Career ==
=== Service with the Pakistan Air Force (1960–1971) ===
After training with the Cessna T-37C Tweet aircraft and further education at Luke Air Force Base, Arizona, with North American F-86F Sabres, in 1963, Azam was posted briefly in Dhaka before becoming an instructor with the Lockheed T-33A T-Birds at PAF's No. 2 Squadron (Jet Conversion Unit) in Mauripur, Karachi. While still posted as an instructor, Azam flew in the September 1965 war with India as part of PAF's No. 17 Squadron from PAF Base Sargodha, flying F-86Fs. After returning from a successful ground attack, Azam's group encountered Indian Folland Fo.141 Gnat F.1 interceptors; Azam shot down the aircraft and the Flying Officer was Mayadev of the Indian Air Force. Flying Officer Mayadev ejected and was captured by Pakistani soldiers on the ground. Throughout the 1965 war, Azam took part in 12 ground-attack missions which inflicted heavy damage on Indian armed forces. For his actions, Azam was awarded the Sitara-e-Jurat, Pakistan's third highest military award. In 1966, he assumed the command of PAF's No. 2 Squadron.

In November 1966, he was sent by the Pakistan Air Force on deputation as an adviser to the Royal Jordanian Air Force. According to Pakistani sources, during the 1967 Arab Israel war, Flight Lieutenant Saiful Azam shot down a Dassault Mystère IVA, a transonic fighter-bomber belonging to the Israeli Air Force (IAF) while flying a Hawker Hunter FGA.73 of the Jordanian Air Force. According to the same sources, a day later, he was shifted to an Iraqi airbase where he shot down a SNCASO SO-4050 Vautour IIN interceptor and Dassault Mirage IIICJ 'Shahak' belonging to the Israeli Air Force while flying a Hawker Hunter F.Mk.59 belongs to the No.1 Squadron of the Iraqi Airforce. To date, he holds the record for most Israeli Air Force aircraft shot down.

In 1969, after completing his overseas deputation, he returned in service to the PAF and spent several years as flight commander at various PAF bases before the creation of Bangladesh.

=== Service with the Bangladesh Air Force (1971–1977) ===
After the independence of Bangladesh in 1971, Azam entered service with the newly formed Bangladesh Air Force in 1974, serving as Director of Flight Safety and Director of Operations before being given command of the Dhaka Air Base and promoted to Group Captain. He retired from active military service in 1977.

=== Post-retirement (1988–2020) ===
Following his retirement from the military, he joined Bangladesh Nationalist Party (BNP). As a BNP candidate, Saiful took part in the 1991 Bangladeshi general election from Pabna-3 and achieved victory.

Subsequently, he entered the private business sector as the managing director of Natasha Trading Agency and as the director of a travel agency with his wife.

== Death ==
Azam died on 14 June 2020 at a Combined Military Hospital in Dhaka Cantonment. Air Chief of Bangladesh Air Force Masihuzzaman Serniabat expressed deep shock and sadness for his death. A state funeral was arranged at the BAF Base Khademul Bashar parade ground including a fly past in honor of him.

The then Chief of Pakistan Air Force Mujahid Anwar Khan and Palestinian ambassador to Pakistan, Ahmed Rabie, expressed grief over the Azam's death. Mujahid Anwar Khan stated that Azam was an exceptional fighter pilot who would always be remembered for his valour and professionalism. Ahmed Rabie stated that "on behalf of all Palestinians, I send our deepest condolences to his family in Pakistan and in Bangladesh."

== See also ==
- Sattar Alvi
- Muhammad Mahmood Alam
- 8-Pass Charlie
