= Singhanagar =

Village in Pabna District, Bangladesh

Coordinates: 23.535°N 89.1929°E

Singhanagar is a village located in Sujanagar Upazila, Pabna District, Bangladesh.
