= Jamshed Ali =

Bangladeshi politician

Member of Bangladesh Parliament
- In office 1979–1986
- Preceded by: Raushanul Haque Moti Mia
- Succeeded by: Wazi Uddin Khan

Personal details
- Party: Bangladesh Nationalist Party

Jamshed Ali is a Bangladesh Nationalist Party politician who served as member of parliament for Pabna-3 from 1979 to 1986.

== Career ==
Ali was elected to parliament from Pabna-3 as a Bangladesh Nationalist Party candidate in 1979.
