= Muhammad Ali Asgar =

Bangladeshi politician

- মুহাম্মাদ আলী আছগার

Member of the Bangladesh Parliament for Pabna-3
- Incumbent
- Assumed office 17 February 2026
- Preceded by: Md. Mokbul Hossain

Personal details
- Born: March 1, 1966 (age 60)q Bhangura Upazila, Pabna District
- Party: Bangladesh Jamaat-e-Islami

Muhammad Ali Asgar is a Bangladeshi politician of the Bangladesh Jamaat-e-Islami. He is currently serving as a member of parliament from Pabna-3.

== Early life ==
Asgar was born on 1 March 1966 in Bhangura Upazila in Pabna District.
