= Osman Ghani Khan =

Bangladeshi politician

- ওসমান গণি খান
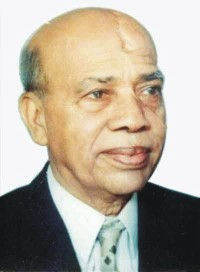

Chairman of United Nations Board of Auditors
- In office 1980–1982

2nd Comptroller and Auditor General (Bangladesh)
- In office 1 March 1976 – 31 December 1982
- Preceded by: Fazle Kader Muhammad Abdul Baqui
- Succeeded by: A K Azizul Huq

Member of Parliament
- In office 20 March 1991 – 30 March 1996
- Preceded by: Mokbul Hossain
- Succeeded by: AKM Salim Reza Habib
- Constituency: Pabna-2

State Minister of Public Administration
- Prime Minister: Khaleda Zia

Personal details
- Born: 1 January 1923 Bera, Pabna, Bengal Presidency, British India (now in Bangladesh)
- Died: 26 April 2000 (aged 77) Singapore
- Party: Bangladesh Nationalist Party
- Relations: Nurul Alam Khan (Brother)
- Education: MA (economics)
- Alma mater: University of Calcutta

Osman Ghani Khan (1923-2000) was the former chairman of the United Nations Board of Auditors, a Bangladeshi civil servant, economist, Bangladesh Nationalist Party politician and a member of parliament for Pabna-2.

== Education ==
Khan passed higher secondary from Government Saadat College in 1940. In 1943 and 1945, he received his B.A. (Honours) and M.A. in Economics from University of Calcutta, respectively. He joined the Bengal Civil Service as a Deputy Magistrate in 1946, initially serving at Barasat.

== Career ==
Khan transferred to the East Bengal Civil Service in 1947 and served as Additional District Magistrate of Dinajpur and Mymensingh. Thereafter he was appointed as Special Secretary in the Provincial Home Ministry. In 1954 he was appointed as District Magistrate of Barisal and in 1956, he became District Magistrate of Jessore. For a time in the 1960s he served as Joint Secretary in the Ministry of Education. Khan was appointed the first Defense secretary of Bangladesh in 1972. He was appointed to the constitutional post Comptroller and Auditor General of Bangladesh at 1976. From 1980 to 1982, Khan was elected as chairman of the United Nations Board of Auditors. After retirement, he was elected as a member of parliament from Pabna-2 as a Bangladesh Nationalist Party candidate in 1991. He was appointed the Minister of Public Administration.

== Death ==
Khan died on 26 April 2000 in Mount Elizabeth Hospital, Singapore.
