= Shahitto Potrika =

- Type: Research journal
- Owner(s): Bangla Department, University of Dhaka
- Founder: Muhammad Abdul Hye
- Publisher: Dhaka University Press
- Editor: Hosne Ara
- Associate editor: Tariq Manzoor
- Founded: Asharh, 1364 Bangabd (1957)
- Language: Bengali
- Headquarters: Bangla Department, University of Dhaka
- Circulation: 60 years
- ISSN: 0558-1583 (print); 3006-886X (web)
- Website: আনুষ্ঠানিক বাতায়ন
- Free online archives: আর্কাইভ

Shahitto Potrika is a research magazine published by University of Dhaka Bangla Department.

== History ==
Shahitto Potrika was first published in 1364 Bangabd (1957) in the month of Asadha. The magazine was originally published for the purpose of publishing research articles related to Bangla literature and language and the history and culture of this country. Muhammad Abdul Hye was the founder-editor of Shahitto Potrika. Shahitto Potrika has attracted the attention of Bengali-speaking scholars and students since its publication. It publishes articles on domestic and foreign literature, comparative criticism, Folklore, literature, Linguistics, dictionaries, calligraphy, periodicals, Music, Painting, theology etc. Online edition of Sahitya Patrika started in 1430 Bangla (2023) and web archive of issues published in previous years. Shahitto Potrika has so far published 1280 research articles in 128 issues of 58 years.

== Publication history ==
The online edition of Shahitto Potrika started in 1430 Bangla (2023) and web archive of issues published in previous years. Shahitto Potrika has so far published 1280 research articles in 128 issues over 60 years.
