= Sujanagar Upazila =

Sujanagar সুজানগর
- Upazila of Bangladesh
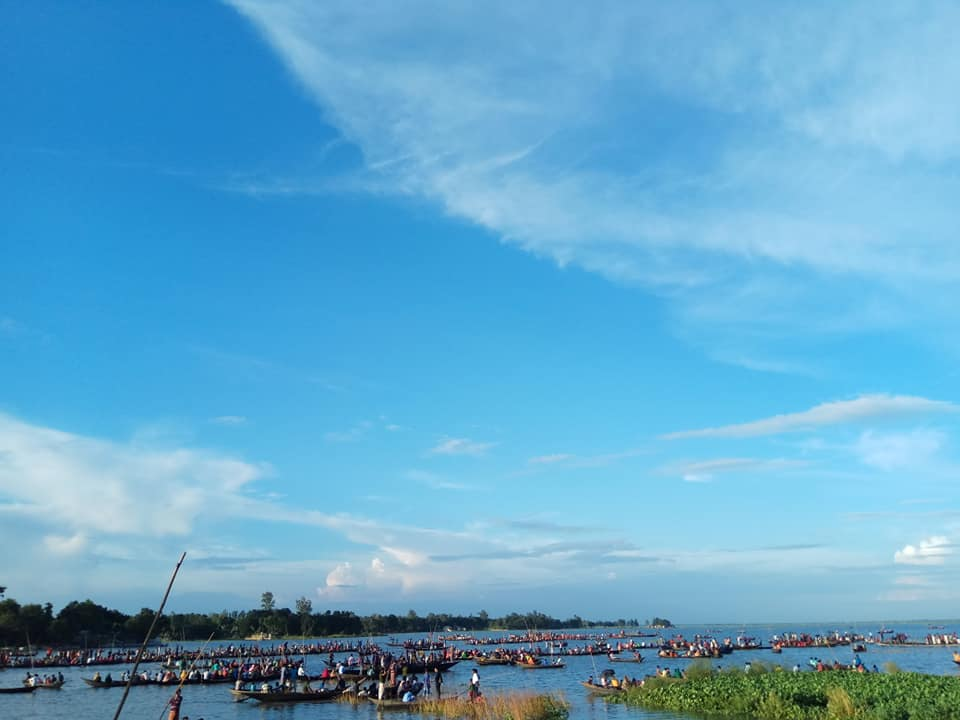
- Crowds around Gazna Beel

- Coordinates: 23°55′N 89°26′E
- Country: Bangladesh
- Division: Rajshahi
- District: Pabna
- Thana: 1872
- Upazila: 1983
- Capital: Sujanagar

Government
  - Upazila Chairman: Shahinuzzaman Shahin
  - MP (Pabna-2): Ahmed Firoz Kabir

Area
  - Total: 338.65 km^{2} (130.75 sq mi)

Population (2022)
  - Total: 305,576
  - Density: 902.34/km^{2} (2,337.0/sq mi)
- Time zone: UTC+6 (BST)
- Postal code: 6660
- Area code: 07329
- Website: sujanagar.pabna.gov.bd

Sujanagar Upazila mauza geocode map

Sujanagar (Bengali: সুজানগর) is an upazila of the Pabna District of northern Bangladesh's Rajshahi Division. It is the home of agriculture across the district, and the Onion Capital of the country.

== History ==
Sujanagar (lit. City of Shuja) takes its name from the time when Mughal prince Shah Shuja sought refuge with his army in Arakan after being defeated in the war of imperial succession in 1660 CE. During this journey, Shah Shuja spent three nights in Govindaganj, which was renamed to Sujanagar in his honour.

Several people are associated with the spread of Islam into Sujanagar and are part of a long history of interactions between the Middle East, Turkestan, and South Asia. Shah Mahtab Uddin Awliya was a Sufi pir who now lies buried in the Shatania mazar (mausoleum) in the village of Pukurania, Sagarkandi Union. Sharfuddin Sarkar of Samarkand settled in Dulai (Ahladipur village) and his son, Munshi Rahimuddin Chowdhury, founded the Dulai Zamindari. His son, Azim Chowdhury, was a powerful landlord of Sujanagar who participated in the anti-colonial Sepoy Revolt in 1857. The zamindar's army was dealt with by the British Lieutenant-Governor in great length but was eventually defeated. On the other hand, the Hindu zamindar dynasty of Tantiband founded by Upendra Narayan Chaudhury and then led by Vijaya Govinda Chaudhury (son of Guru Govinda Chaudhury), assisted the British in suppressing the rebellion. Vijaya Govinda Chaudhury deployed his troops at the banks of the Padma and Jamuna as the rebels were utilising the river-routes. Vijaya Govinda Chaudhury was awarded by the British government, and the Tantiband Estate was even visited by Viceroy Lord Mayo.

In 1872, a thana (police outpost) was established in Sujanagar. The people of Sujanagar rebelled against the British Raj again in 1872 and 1926. The Ulat Siddiqia Fazil Madrasa was founded in 1915. In the East Pakistan period, Jamadar Abul Husayn of Sujanagar was shot dead at the Sujanagar High School playground by the Pakistan police on 21 February 1969. During the Bangladesh Liberation War of 1971, the Bengali freedom fighters and Pakistan Army fought each other in places like Sagarkandi, Bhabanipur, Nischintapur and Satbaria. The latter three were mass killing sites. Three Bengali freedom fighters were murdered on 14 December. Another three freedom fighters were also killed: Abdul Awwal, Abdul Barik and Abdus Sadiq. On 15 December, Sujanagar gained liberation from Pakistan. Sujanagar Thana was upgraded to an upazila (sub-district) in 1983 as part of the President of Bangladesh Hussain Muhammad Ershad's decentralisation programme.

== Geography ==
Sujanagar is located at 23.9167°N 89.4333°E. It is located on the flood plain created by silt carried by the Padma River. It has 63,676 households and total area 338.65 km^{2}

=== Gazna Beel ===
The Gazna beel is located in the middle of Sujanagar upazila. All settlements are located on the four sides of the beel. The economy of the area is regulated by this Gazna beel. The beel consists of 16 beel, large and small. The area of this bill is 12 square miles or 3100 hector or 31 square kilometers . It is connected to the river Padma through the Badai Sluice Gate and captures the beauty of the rainy season. During the rainy season, many visitors come here to enjoy the beauty of the beel. Lots of native fish are found in the beel. In the dry season the bill dries up, at this time Eri paddy and a lot of onion are cultivated in this beel. If the canals of this beel are dug, there will be water and fish throughout the year increase the production of fish many times. All the 10 unions of Sujanagar are connected with this beel.

== Demographics ==
Religions in Sujanagar Upazila (2022)
Religion	Percent
Islam	97.07%
Hinduism	2.92%
Other or not stated	0.01%

According to the 2022 Bangladeshi census, Sujanagar Upazila had 77,651 households and a population of 305,576. 9.30% of the population were under 5 years of age. Sujanagar had a literacy rate (age 7 and over) of 66.98%: 68.11% for males and 65.91% for females, and a sex ratio of 96.75 males for every 100 females. 48,123 (15.75%) lived in urban areas.

According to the 2011 Census of Bangladesh, Sujanagar Upazila had 63,676 households and a population of 278,096. 66,901 (24.06%) were under 10 years of age. Sujanagar had a literacy rate (age 7 and over) of 41.92%, compared to the national average of 51.8%, and a sex ratio of 1007 females per 1000 males. 35,461 (12.75%) lived in urban areas.

As of the 1991 Bangladesh census, Sujanagar has a population of 214132. Males constitute 51.86% of the population, and females 48.14%. Upazila's population over the age of eighteen is 102,202. Sujanagar has an average literacy rate of 26.7% (7+ years), and the national average of 32.4% literate.

== Administration ==
Sujanagar Upazila is divided into Sujanagar Municipality and ten union parishads: Ahammedpur, Bhayna, Dulai, Hatkhali, Manikhat, Nazirganj, Raninagar, Sagar Kandi, Satbaria, and Tantibanda. The union parishads are subdivided into 191 mauzas and 182 villages.

Sujanagar Municipality is subdivided into 9 wards and 24 mahallas.

=== Chairmen ===
List of chairmen
Name	Village	Term	Notes
Ahmed Tafiz Uddin	Tarabaria, Satbaria Union	25/5/1985-23/11/1991	
Ahmed Firoz Kabir	Tarabaria, Satbaria Union	31/3/2009-2/4/2014	
Abul Kashem		2015	
Abdul Kader Rokon		2016	
Shahinuzzaman Shahin		present	

== Economy and tourism ==
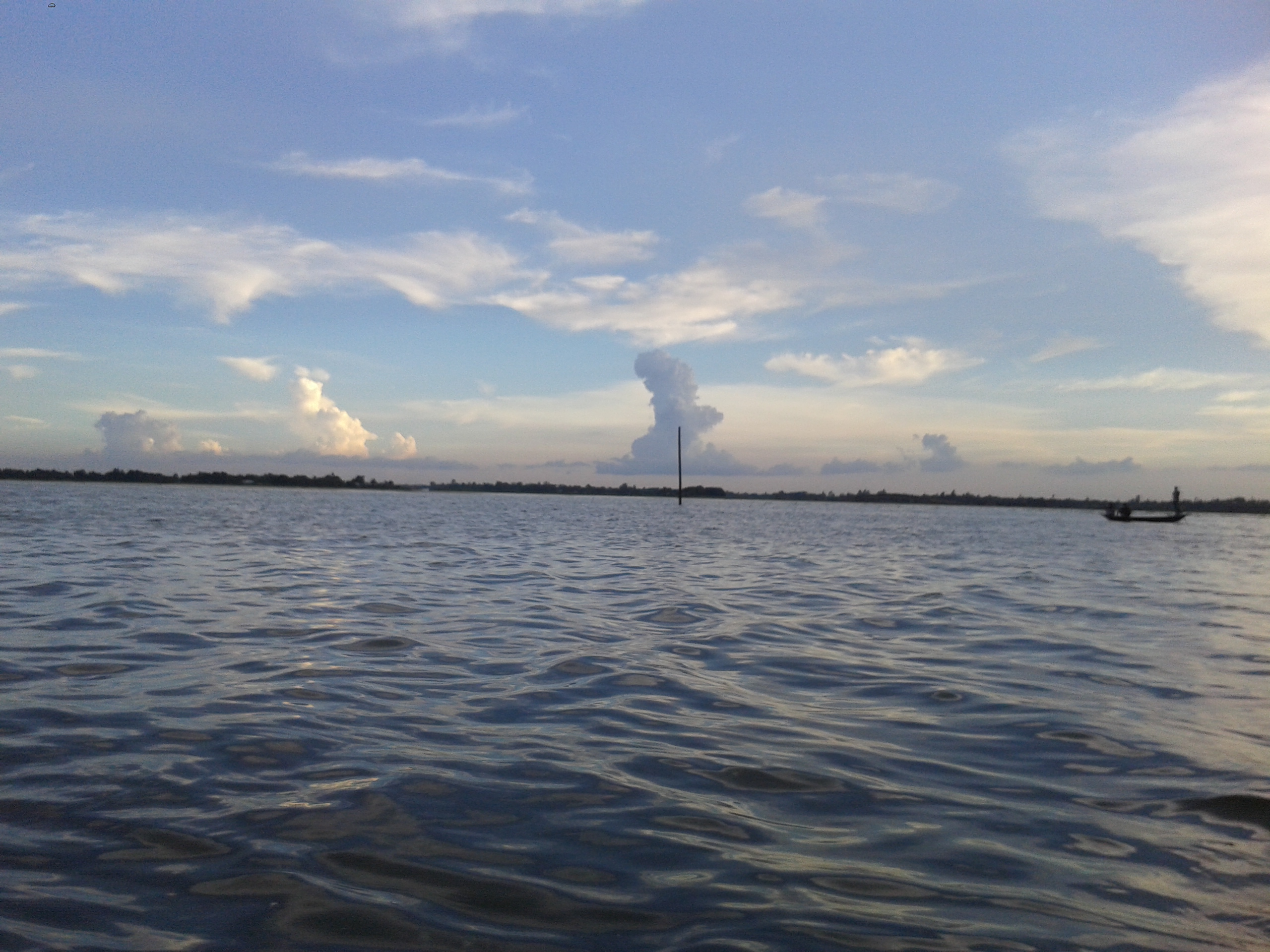
The ancient Gazna beel of Sujanagar plays an important role in the sub-district's economy.

Sujanagar has many tourist attractions. Aside from the natural attractions like Padma River and Gazna beel, there is also Azim Chowdhury's Zamindar Palace in Dulai, Vijay Gobind Chowdhury's Palace in Tantiband, Shah Mahtab Uddin Aulia's mazar (mausoleum) in Pukurania. The Nazirganj Ferry Ghat lies opposite of Rajbari District and allows transportation between North Bengal and South Bengal. There are roughly 304 mosques in the sub-district. Notable of these are the Dulai Chowdhury Bari Jame Mosque built by Zamindar Munshi Rahimuddin Sarkar Chowdhury in 1802, Satbaria Jame Mosque and Sujanagar Jame Mosque.

Another important tradition are the onions of Sujanagar Upazila, which is a pride of its residents. Sujanagar Upazila produces a large quantity of onions and supplies to all parts of Bangladesh. Accordingly, Sujanagar can be called the Onion Capital of Bangladesh. Recently, mineral oil has been discovered in the village of Mubarakpur in Ahammadpur Union.

== Notable people ==
- Abdul Ghani Hazari, award-winning poet and journalist
- Abdus Sobhan, Islamic scholar and former member of Bangladeshi parliament
- A. B. Mirza Azizul Islam, economist and government advisor, was born at Durgapur in 1941.
- Ahmed Firoz Kabir, member of Bangladeshi parliament
- Ahmed Tafiz Uddin, former member of Bangladeshi parliament
- AKM Salim Reza Habib, former member of Bangladeshi parliament
- Chanchal Chowdhury, actor
- Zamindars of Dulai, of the erstwhile Bengali aristocracy
- M. A. Matin, former member of Bangladeshi parliament
- Mirza Abdur Rashid, member of parliament, was born at Durgapur in 1918.
- Muhammad Mansuruddin, award-winning educationist and folklorist
- Sarder Jayenuddin, award-winning writer, novelist and editor
- Zia Ahmed, Major General and chairman of Bangladesh Telecommunication Regulatory Commission
- Muhammad Ishaq, founder Ameer of Khelafat Majlis and minister of East Pakistan

== See also ==
- Upazilas of Bangladesh
- Districts of Bangladesh
- Divisions of Bangladesh

== Official Website ==
Visit Sujanagar Website for more info
