= M. A. Matin =

M. A. Matin may refer to:

- M. A. Matin (general), major general in the Bangladesh Army, Minister of Home Affairs from 2007
- M. A. Matin (Chandpur politician) (died 2020), Bangladesh Nationalist Party MP for Comilla-23 and Chandpur-5
- M. A. Matin (Kurigram politician) (born 1956), Jatiya Sangsad member for Kurigram-3 2019–
- M. A. Matin (Magura politician), Bangladeshi military official and MP for Magura-1 1986–1990
- M. A. Matin (Pabna-2 politician), Bangladesh Nationalist Party MP for Pabna-2 1979–1982
- M. A. Matin (Pabna-5 politician) (died 2012), Deputy Prime Minister of Bangladesh 1984–1988
