= Ankutia =

Ankutia আনকুটিয়া
- Village
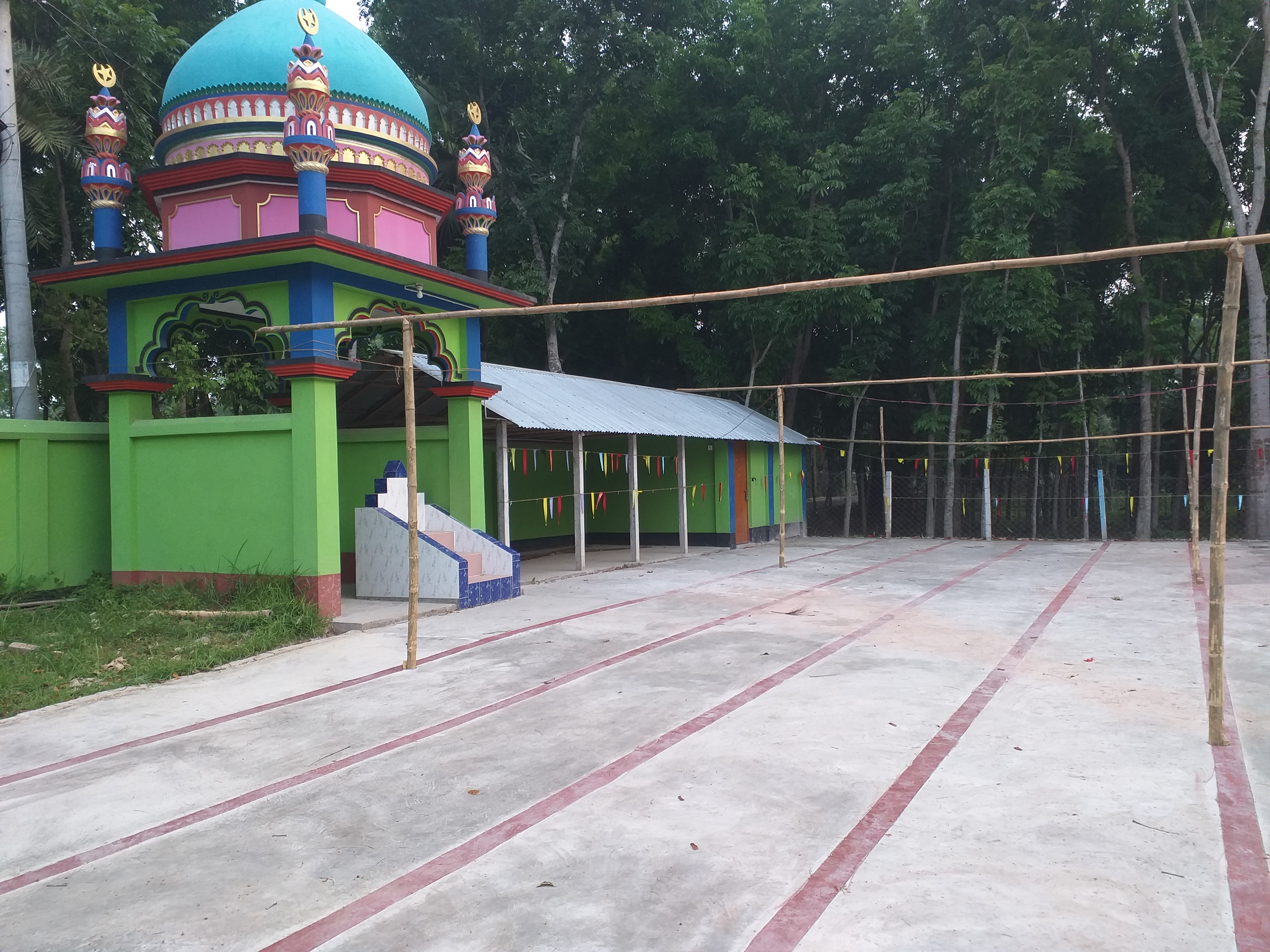
- Ankutia Eidgah 2024

- Location in Bangladesh
- Coordinates: 24°12′N 89°14.9′E
- Country: Bangladesh
- Division: Rajshahi Division
- District: Pabna District
- Upazila: Chatmohar

Area
  - Total: 2.25 km^{2} (0.87 sq mi)

Population (2011)
  - Total: 1,874
  - Density: 833/km^{2} (2,160/sq mi)
- Time zone: UTC+6 (BST)
- Postal code: 6630

Ankutia (Bengali: আনকুটিয়া) is a village of Chatmohar Upazila of Pabna District in the Division of Rajshahi, Bangladesh.

== Demographics ==
According to the 2011 Bangladesh census, Ankutia had 510 households and a population of 1,874. The literacy rate (age 7 and over) was 49.7%, compared to the national average of 51.8%.

== See also ==
- Upazilas of Bangladesh
- Districts of Bangladesh
- Divisions of Bangladesh
