= Rangalia =

Rangalia রাঙ্গালিয়া
- Village
- Location in Bangladesh
- Coordinates: 24.1905790°N 89.3844196°E
- Country: Bangladesh
- Division: Rajshahi
- District: Pabna
- Upazila: Bhangura

Population (2012)
  - Total: 1,245
- Time zone: UTC+6 (BST)

Rangalia is a village of Bhangura Upazila in Pabna District, Bangladesh.
