= Md. Mokbul Hossain (Pabna-3 politician) =

Bangladeshi politician

Member of the Bangladesh Parliament for Pabna-3
- In office 5 January 2014 – 6 August 2024
- Preceded by: K. M. Anowarul Islam
- Succeeded by: Muhammad Ali Asgar

Personal details
- Born: 20 January 1950 (age 76) Pabna
- Party: Bangladesh Awami League

Md. Mokbul Hossain (born 20 January 1950) is a Bangladesh Awami League politician and a former Jatiya Sangsad member representing the Pabna-3 constituency.

== Early life ==
Hossain was born on 20 January 1950. He completed his studies up to S.S.C., or grade ten.

== Career ==
Hossain was elected to parliament on 5 January 2014 from Pabna-3 as a Bangladesh Awami League candidate.
