= Per Bhangura Union =

Union Parishad in Bangladesh

Per Bahngura (Bengali: পারভাঙ্গুড়া) is a union parishad under Bhangura Upazila of Pabna District in the Rajshahi Division of western Bangladesh.

== Geography ==
It is located in the southern part of the Bhangura upazila. It is situated at the bank of the river Baral.

== Administration ==
Per Bhangura union comprises eight villages. They are Per Bhangura, Pathorghata, Bheramara, Hutgram, Kalika Daha, Patulipara, Kashipur and Rangalia. The union council building is at Bheramara.

Union Parishad Chairman: Alhaz Hedhayeatul Haque

== Infrastructure ==
There is a post office, health centre, secondary school, four primary schools and two bazaars – Bheramara and Jogatola in this union.

=== Transport ===
Per Bhangura is well communicated with other parts of the upazila and district. It is also well communicated with rest of the country by road, rail and river.

== Notable residents ==
- Diplomat M Hossain Ali was born in this union. A road is named after him near his birthplace.
