= Raushanul Haque Moti Mia =

Bangladeshi politician

Member of Bangladesh Parliament
- In office 1973–1979
- Succeeded by: Jamshed Ali

Personal details
- Political party: Bangladesh Awami League

Raushanul Haque Moti Mia is a Bangladesh Awami League politician and a former member of parliament for Pabna-3.

== Career ==
Mia was elected to parliament from Pabna-3 as a Bangladesh Awami League candidate in 1973.
