= Syed Haider Ali =

Bangladeshi politician

- সৈয়দ হায়দার আলী

Member of 1st Jatiya Sangsad
- In office 1973–1976
- Preceded by: M. A. Matin
- Succeeded by: M. A. Matin
- Constituency: Pabna-2

Personal details
- Born: c. 1933 Sirajganj, Pabna District, Bengal Presidency
- Died: 3 January 2013 (aged 79–80) Gulshan, Dhaka, Bangladesh
- Party: Awami League

Syed Haidar Ali (Bengali: সৈয়দ হায়দার আলী; died 3 January 2013) was a Bangladeshi politician, businessman, and independence activist. He was a former member of parliament for Pabna-2.

== Early life and family ==
Syed Haidar Ali was born in c. 1933 as the youngest son of Syed Akbar Ali, in Sirajganj, then part of the Pabna District. Ali belonged to a Bengali Muslim family. He had two sons and one daughter. His son-in-law, Syed Shahed Reza, was the Bangladeshi Ambassador to Kuwait.

== Career ==
Ali was active in the six point movement, the Bengali language movement, and the Bangladesh Liberation War of 1971. He was elected to parliament from Pabna-2 as an Awami League candidate following the 1973 Bangladeshi general elections.

He established the Syed Akbar Ali High School in the village of Chandidasganti.

== Death ==
Ali died at his own home in Gulshan on 3 January 2013.
