= Government Haji Jamal Uddin Degree College =

Government Haji Jamal Uddin Degree (Hon's) College
- সরকারি হাজী জামাল উদ্দিন কলেজ
- Motto: শিক্ষা, ঐক্য, প্রগতি
- Established: 1970
- Affiliations: Rajshahi Education Board
- Principal: Sarker Md. Ahsanul Habib
- Location: Pabna, Bhungura, 6640, Bangladesh; 24.2203°N 89.3805°E
- Website: ghjc.edu.bd

Government Haji Jamal Uddin Degree (Hon's) College is a government college which situated on the bank of river Baral in Bhungura under Pabna district in Bangladesh.
