= M Hossain Ali =

Indian politician

- হোসেন আলী
- Born: 1 February 1923; Pathorghata, Bengal Presidency, British India
- Died: 2 January 1981 (aged 57); Canada
- Education: University of Karachi
- Occupation: Diplomat

Mohammad Hossain Ali was a Bangladeshi diplomat and former ambassador to the United States.

== Early life ==
Ali was born in Pathorghata, Pabna District, Bengal Presidency, British India on 1 February 1923. In 1945 he graduated from University of Dhaka with a bachelor's degree in chemistry. In 1948, he completed his LLB from University of Karachi in 1948. In 1949 he completed the Pakistan Civil Service examination and joined the foreign service. He studied further on foreign policy and diplomacy in Foreign Service Institute in Washington D.C. and in the British foreign office in London. He completed a diploma program in the Paris-based Institute of International Relations.

== Career ==
Ali was posted in a number of different diplomatic posts including in Australia, Belgium, Turkey, Saudi Arabia, Burma, United Kingdom and Netherlands. During the Bangladesh Liberation War in 1971, he was the Deputy High Commissioner at Calcutta, India for Pakistan. He was transferred by the government to West Pakistan. On 18 April 1971, he refused to obey the orders and declared his allegiance to the Bangladesh government in exile. He was supported by 65 of his colleagues in the commission. The Pakistan High Commission in Kolkata was changed to the Bangladesh High Commission.

The flag of Bangladesh was raised in the Embassy compound. It was just one day after the declaration of the People's Republic of Bangladesh at Baidyanathtala. First Secretary Rafiqul Islam Chowdhury, third Secretary Anwarul Karim Chowdhury and Assistant Press Attaché Moqshed Ali were also present in that ceremony and were negotiating with other nations for support of Bangladeshi independence. The role of Ali is very important, as he pioneered the way for other expatriate Bengali diplomats to pledge their allegiance to the new Bangladesh Government. Ali was then named Chief of Mission at Calcutta for Bangladesh.

Following this lead, Bengali diplomats defected to the new government at the missions in New York, Washington, D.C., London, Baghdad, Manila, Kathmandu, Buenos Aires, Tokyo, Hong Kong, Lagos and Bern. In 1972, Ali was appointed the first High Commissioner in Australia for Bangladesh and later served as the first Bangladeshi Ambassador to the United States. He served as the ambassador of Bangladesh to West Germany from 1976 to 1979. He was then appointed the ambassador of Bangladesh to Canada.

== Death and legacy ==
Ali died on 2 January 1981 in Canada. He is one of the ambassadors of then state of Pakistan, who advanced globally to recognise the ipseity and liberation of "Bangladesh ". During the post-1971 period of Bangladeshi political paradigm, he is said to assist the progeny of Sheikh Mujibur Rahman, ie, Prime Minister Sheikh Hasina and Sheikh Rehana.
