= M. A. Matin (Pabna-2 politician) =

Bangladeshi politician

- এম এ মাতিন

Member of Parliament for Pabna-2
- In office 1979–1982
- Preceded by: Syed Haider Ali
- Succeeded by: Mokbul Hossain

Personal details
- Died: 6 May 2024
- Party: Bangladesh Nationalist Party

M. A. Matin is a Bangladesh Nationalist Party politician, physician and a former member of parliament for the Pabna-2 constituency in 1979.

== Career ==
M. A. Matin was elected to parliament from Pabna-2 as a Bangladesh Nationalist Party candidate in 1979 Bangladeshi general election.

== Death ==
Matin died on May 6, 2024. He was buried at Arifpur Cemetery after the funeral prayer at Dilalpur Jame Mosque in Pabna city on Monday after Maghrib prayers.
