= Mohela BL High School =

Information
- Established: 1941
- School board: Rajshahi Education Board
- Headmaster: Ashraf Uddin
- Teaching staff: 20
- Grades: 6–10
- Gender: Originally it was an all-boys high school. Co-education has been introduced.
- Enrollment: 600
- Campus size: 25 acres
- Campus type: Rural
- Sports: Cricket, football, badminton
- Website: Official website under construction

Mohela BL (Bi-Lateral) High School is a semi-government high school in Chatmohar of Pabna district in Bangladesh. The school is one of the oldest educational institution in Parshawdanga union parishad. The school is also known as Mohela Uccha Viddalaya to local people. Around 600 students, including boys and girls, are currently studying at Mohela High School. Following demands to enroll more students, the school authorities opened four more class rooms in a new building.

== Secondary School Certificate (SSC) 2008 ==
150 students from Mohela High School scored average GPA 4.5 in 2008. A total of 90 students achieved first division from Rajshahi Education Board.
