= Azim Choudhury Zamindar Bari =

Historic zamindar bari in Bangladesh

- Dulai Zamindari, Pabna
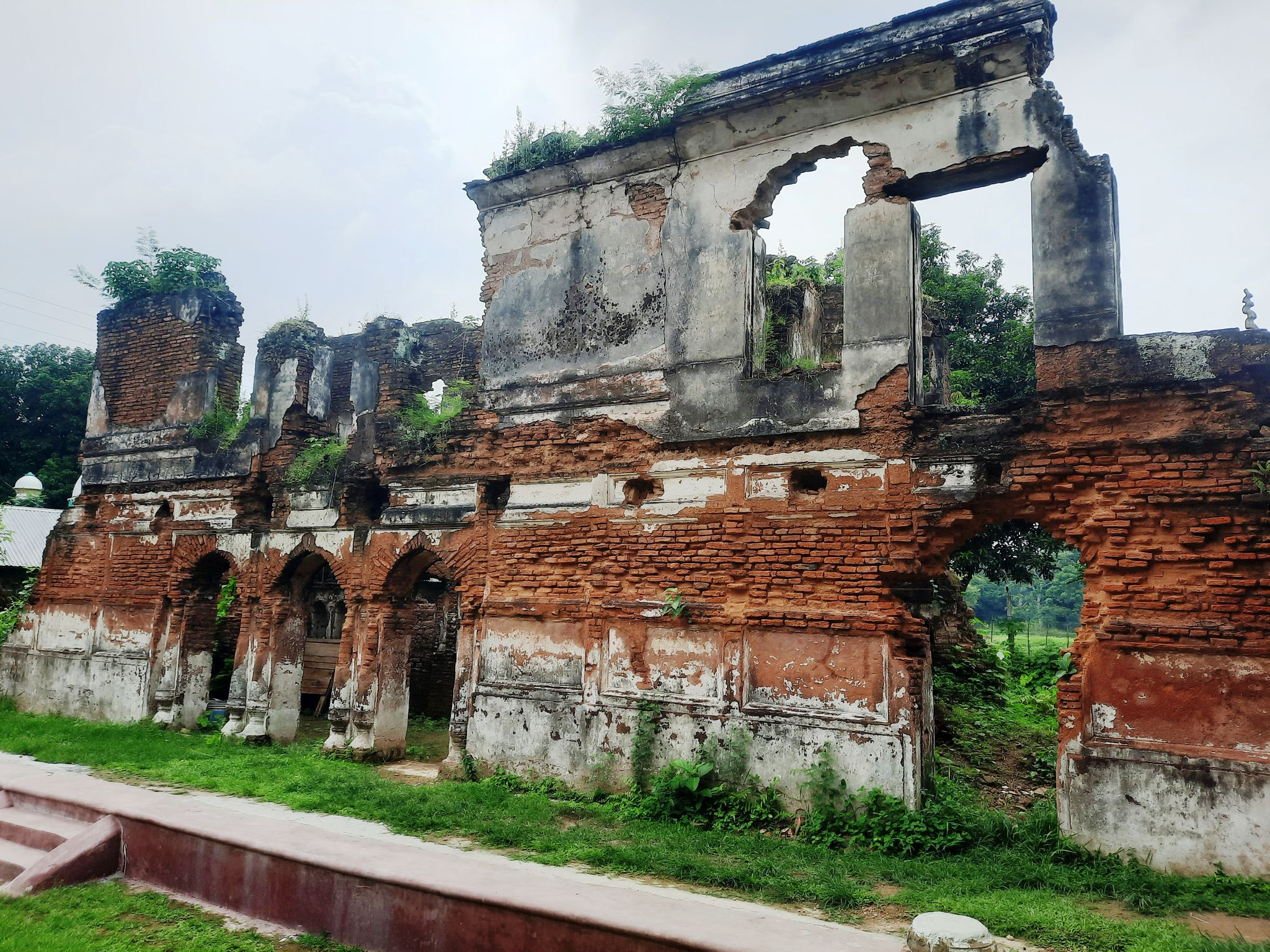
- Darbar Courtyard
- Alternative names: Azim Choudhury Zamindar Bari

General information
- Type: Residence
- Location: Sujanagar Upazila, Dulai, Sujanagar Upazila, Pabna District, Bangladesh
- Coordinates: 23°56′54.1″N 89°31′02.7″E
- Opening: 1700s
- Owner: Rahimuddin Chowdhury

Technical details
- Material: Brick, stone and rod

The Azim Choudhury Zamindar Bari (Bengali: আজিম চৌধুরীর জমিদার বাড়ি) is a historic estate and Bengali family based in the village of Dulai in Sujanagar, Pabna District.

== History ==
আমি ও পটু মিয়া চাচা বাড়ি থাকি।
ami o pôtu miya chacha bari thaki
মছজেদে পড়িয়া কত হইয়াছি সুখী॥
môsjede pôriya kôtô hôiyasi shukhi
লতিফুল্লা মিয়া সঙ্গে থাকিয়া হামেসা।
lôtifulla miya shonge thakiya hamesha
চৌধুরী আজিমের কত পাইয়াছি ভালোবাসা॥
choudhuri azimer kôtô paiyasi bhalobasha

— Azim Chowdhury written by Haji Badruddin in 1298 A.H. (1880-1881 CE).

=== Sharfuddin Sarkar and Rahimuddin Chowdhury ===
The zamindar palace was established 250 years ago in the village of Dulai, Sujanagar, Pabna by a Muslim aristocrat known as Munshi Rahimuddin Sarkar (1722-1815). His father, Sharfuddin Sarkar, settled in Dulai (Ahladipur village), after migrating from Samarkand in Turkestan. Rahimuddin was the serestadar and peshkar (deputy minister) at the Rajshahi Collectorate Office in Natore, and was a munshi proficient in Arabic and Persian. He was later bestowed the title of Chowdhury. In 1802, he built a mosque in the estate which still exists today.

=== Azim Chowdhury ===
The zamindari gained repute under his son and successor, Fakhruddin Ahle Ahsan Azim Chowdhury (1790-1880), also known as Moulvi Azimuddin Chowdhury or simply Azim Chowdhury. He established three indigo factories in Dulai and was well known for his charity work too. The Dulai dispensary, according to William Wilson Hunter in A Statistical Account of Bengal, was "entirely supported" by Azim Chowdhury. It was established in October 1867 and was one of the three dispensaries in Pabna District at the time.

== Present day ==
At present, this zamindar house is in ruins, although it is currently being maintained by the descendants of this zamindar house. In fact, after the abolition of the zamindari system through the East Bengal State Acquisition and Tenancy Act of 1950, it became subordinate to the government. Later, the descendants of this zamindar house, like Faruq Husayn Chowdhury and Ahsan Jan Chowdhury, got this estate back in 1994 through a long legal process. Since then they have been in charge of the maintenance of this palace.

== See also ==
- Zamindars of Mahipur
