= Chatmohar RCN and BSN High School =

Chatmohar RCN and BSN Model Pilot High School and College
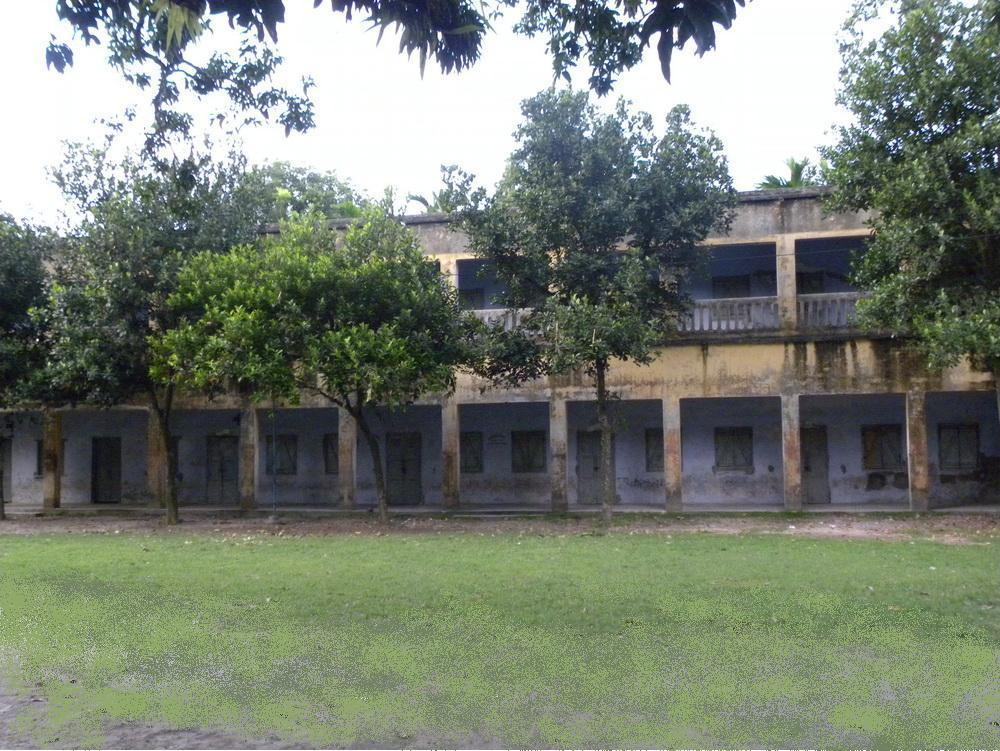
- The school premises

Location
- Chatmohar Nutan Bazar; Chatmohar; Pabna, 6630; Bangladesh
- Coordinates: 24°13′21″N 89°18′3″E

Information
- Established: 1861; 165 years ago
- Founder: Raja Chandra Nath and Babu Shambhu Nath
- School board: Rajshahi Education Board
- Headmaster: Abdul Zabbar
- Grades: 6–12
- Gender: Originally it was an all-boys high school. Co-education has been introduced.
- Age range: 11–16
- Language: Bengali
- Campus size: 10 acres
- Campus type: Semi-urban
- Colors: White and khaki
- Sports: Cricket, football, badminton

Chatmohar Raja Chandra Nath and Babu Shambhu Nath Model Pilot High School and College, also referred to as Chatmohar High School or Chatmohar RCN and BSN Model Pilot High School (Bengali: চাটমোহর রাজা চন্দ্রনাথ ও বাবু শম্ভুনাথ মডেল পাইলট উচ্চ বিদ্যালয় এন্ড কলেজ), is a Public school in Chatmohar Upazila of Pabna District in Bangladesh.

The school, founded in 1861, is one of the oldest educational institutions in Bangladesh. The school offers education for students ranging from sixth grade to twelfth grade.

== Gallery ==
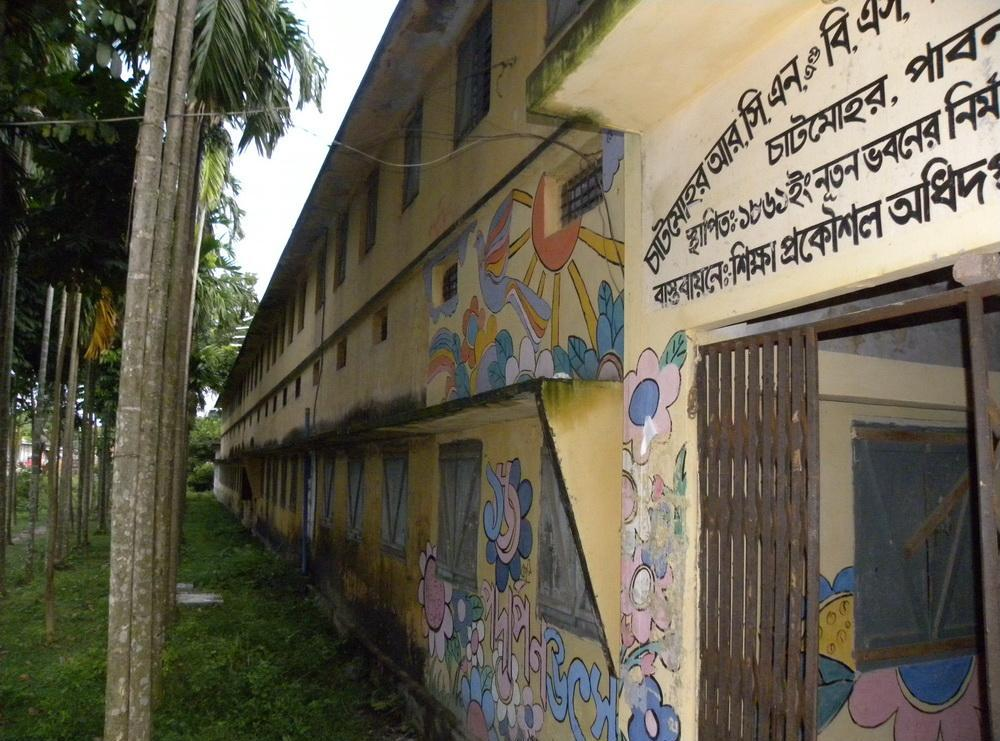
Main gate and Academic Building

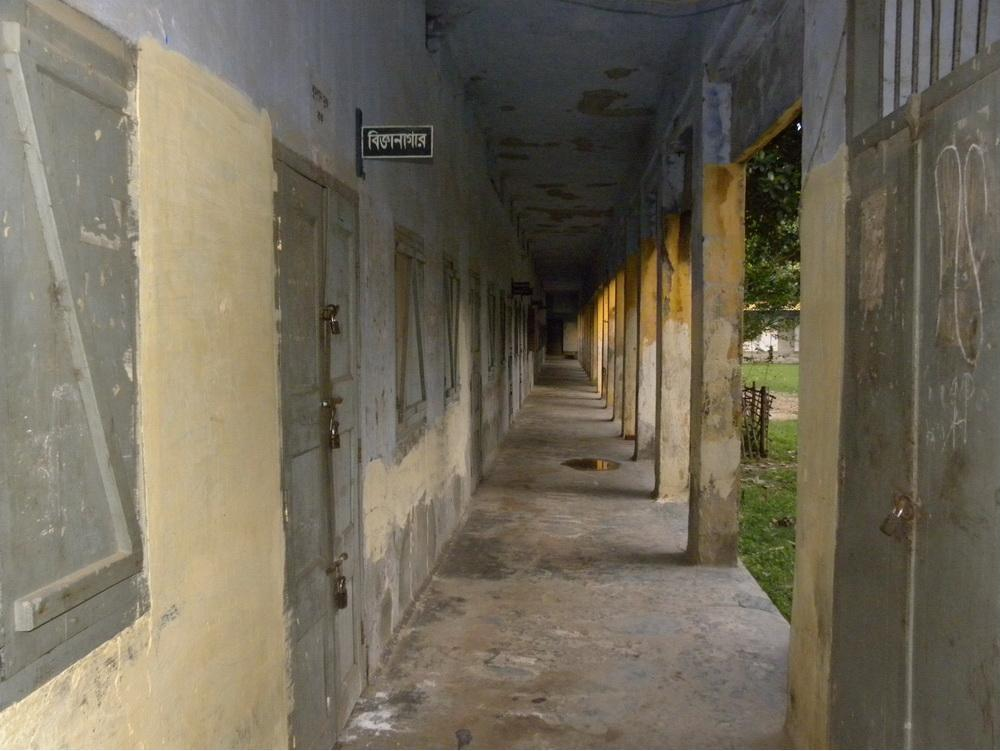
Corridor and classrooms
