= Mothurapur Union =

Mothurapur Union মথুরাপুর ইউনিয়ন
- Union
- Location in Bangladesh
- Coordinates: 24°13.5′N 89°17.5′E
- Country: Bangladesh
- Division: Rajshahi Division
- District: Pabna District
- Upazila: Chatmohar Upazila
- Time zone: UTC+6 (BST)
- Postal code: 6636
- Website: Union website

Mothurapur (Bengali: মথুরাপুর) is a village and union parishad of Chatmohar Upazila, Pabna, Bangladesh.

== See also ==
- Villages of Bangladesh
- Unions of Bangladesh
- Upazilas of Bangladesh
- Districts of Bangladesh
- Divisions of Bangladesh
