= Mirza Abdur Rashid =

Bangladeshi politician

Member of Bangladesh Parliament
- In office 1979–1986

Personal details
- Born: 1 January 1918 (age 108) Durgapur, Sujanagar thana, British India
- Party: Bangladesh Nationalist Party
- Children: 8, including A. B. Mirza Azizul Islam (son)

Mirza Abdur Rashid (Bengali: মীর্জা আব্দুর রশিদ) was a Bangladesh Nationalist Party politician and a member of parliament for Pabna-9.

== Biography ==
Mirza Abdur Rashid was born on 1 January 1918 in Durgapur village of what is now Sujanagar Upazila, Pabna District, Bangladesh.

Rashid was elected to parliament from Pabna-9 as a Bangladesh Nationalist Party candidate in 1979.

He died before 2024.
