= Dilpashar Union =

Dilpashar Union দিলপাশার ইঊনিয়ন
- Location in Bangladesh
- Coordinates: 24°13′30″N 89°24′00″E
- Country: Bangladesh
- District: Pabna District

Population
  - Total: 18,253
- Time zone: UTC+6 (BST)
- Postal code: 6640

Dilpashar (Bengali: দিলপাশার) is a union parishad under Bhangura Upazila of Pabna District in the Rajshahi Division of western Bangladesh.

== About ==
Dilpashar union comprises eight villages. They are Chachkia, Kajitol, Betuan, Dilpashar, Magura, Adabariya, Patul, Laxmikol. There is a post office, health center, two secondary schools (B.B. High School & College and Chachkia Govt. Primary School), as well as two bazaars (Betuan and Dilpashar). Renowned Personalities: Abdur Rob Sardar (Ex Chairman), Aminul Islam Khan, Nobo Kumar Gosh, Safiur Rahman, Momtaz, Saiful Islam, Abu Bakkar Khan, Asokh Kumar Prono, Md. Ripon Ahmed Shorif, Muhammad Jakaria.
