= Nurul Alam Khan =

Bangladeshi educator and mathematician

- নুরুল আলম খান
- Professor Dr. Nurul Alam Khan

1st Vice-chancellor of the Royal University of Dhaka
- In office January 2010 – May 2011
- Chancellor: Zillur Rahman
- Succeeded by: Hasan Imtiaz Chowdhury

Personal details
- Born: 15 May 1942 Bera, Pabna, Bengal Presidency, British India (now in Bangladesh)
- Died: 31 August 2025 (aged 83) Dhaka, Bangladesh
- Relations: Osman Ghani Khan (Brother)
- Education: Ph.D. (Mathematics)
- Alma mater: Dhaka University; Charles University; Jagannath College

Nurul Alam Khan (15 March 1942 – 31 August 2025) was a Bangladeshi educator, mathematician, and former professor of mathematics. He served as the first Vice-Chancellor of the Royal University of Dhaka and held various academic positions at universities in Bangladesh and abroad. He is known for his leadership roles in academic institutions and his active involvement in the Bangladesh Mathematical Society.

== Early life and education ==
Nurul Alam Khan was born on 15 March 1942, in Bara, Pabna district. He completed his matriculation from Dhobakhola Coronation High School in 1957, and his I.Sc. from Jagannath College in 1959. He then attended Dhaka University, where he earned his honors degree and completed his master's degree in 1964. He earned his Ph.D. from Charles University, Prague, in 1970.

== Career ==
Khan began his academic career as a lecturer at University of Dhaka in 1965. He held various academic positions including University of Chittagong, University of Mosul, Al-Mustansiriya University, and Al-Fateh University. In 1991, he joined Jahangirnagar University, where he held numerous leadership roles until his retirement in 2007.

Post-retirement, Khan worked at several private universities in Dhaka, including North South University (NSU), American International University-Bangladesh (AIUB), and Uttara University. He served as the Vice-Chancellor of the Royal University of Dhaka from January 2010 to May 2011.

== Contributions ==
Khan has authored several textbooks and published over 25 research papers. He was the Chief Editor of the Journal of Science, Engineering, and Technology at Uttara University and served as the Dean of various faculties. He was also the President of the Bangladesh Mathematical Society from 2020 to 2021.

== Death ==
Professor Khan died on 31 August 2025 in the Combined Military Hospital, Dhaka, Bangladesh.
