= Pabna-2 =

Constituency of Bangladesh's Jatiya Sangsad

Coordinates: 23.94°N 89.41°E

- Constituency for the Jatiya Sangsad
- District: Pabna District
- Division: Rajshahi Division
- Electorate: 300,789 (2018)

Current constituency
- Created: 1973
- Party: Bangladesh Nationalist Party
- Member: AKM Salim Reza Habib
- ← 68 Pabna-1 70 Pabna-3 →

Pabna-2 is a constituency represented in the Jatiya Sangsad (National Parliament) of Bangladesh since 2026 by AKM Salim Reza Habib of the Bangladesh Nationalist Party.

== Boundaries ==
The constituency encompasses Sujanagar Upazila and Bera Upazila.

== History ==
The constituency was created for the first general elections in newly independent Bangladesh, held in 1973.

As of 2008, the constituency encompassed Sujanagar Upazila and the five southernmost union parishads of Bera Upazila: Dhalar Char, Jatsakhni, Masundia, Puran Bharenga, and Ruppur.

Ahead of the 2026 general election, the Election Commission expanded the boundaries of the constituency to include all of Bera Upazila. The change was challenged in court, but ultimately upheld.

== Members of Parliament ==
Election	Member	Party
1973	Syed Haider Ali	Awami League
1979	M. A. Matin	Bangladesh Nationalist Party
Major Boundary Changes
1986	Mokbul Hossain	Jatiya Party
1991	Osman Ghani Khan	Bangladesh Nationalist Party
Feb 1996	AKM Salim Reza Habib	Bangladesh Nationalist Party
Jun 1996	Ahmed Tafiz Uddin	Awami League
1998 by-election	Abdul Karim Khandker	Awami League
2001	AKM Salim Reza Habib	Bangladesh Nationalist Party
2008	Abdul Karim Khandker	Awami League
2014	Azizul Huq Arzu	Awami League
2018	Ahmed Firoz Kabir	Awami League
2024	Ahmed Firoz Kabir	Awami League
2026	AKM Salim Reza Habib	Bangladesh Nationalist Party

== Elections ==
=== Elections in the 2010s ===
Azizul Huq Arzu was elected unopposed in the 2014 general election after opposition parties withdrew their candidacies in a boycott of the election.

=== Elections in the 2000s ===
General Election 2008: Pabna-2
Party	Candidate	Votes	%	±%
AL	A. K. Khandker	116,730	55.1	+8.6
BNP	AKM Salim Reza Habib	95,000	44.9	−8.0
Majority		21,730	10.3	+4.0
Turnout		211,730	90.1	+11.7
AL gain from BNP				

General Election 2001: Pabna-2
Party	Candidate	Votes	%	±%
BNP	AKM Salim Reza Habib	97,704	52.9	+6.0
AL	Mirza Abdul Jalil	86,013	46.5	−1.5
IJOF	Md. Nurul Islam	1,010	0.5	N/A
Independent	Md. Masud Ahmed	125	0.1	N/A
Majority		11,691	6.3	+5.2
Turnout		184,852	78.4	−4.3
BNP gain from AL				

=== Elections in the 1990s ===
Ahmed Tafiz Uddin died in June 1998. Abdul Karim Khandker of the Awami League was elected in a by-election.

General Election June 1996: Pabna-2
Party	Candidate	Votes	%	±%
AL	Ahmed Tafiz Uddin	67,250	48.0	+8.5
BNP	AKM Salim Reza Habib	65,745	46.9	−8.4
Jamaat	Md. Hatem Ali	3,979	2.8	N/A
JP(E)	Mokbul Hossain	2,451	1.7	+1.0
Zaker Party	Md. A. Wahab	424	0.3	−2.1
Independent	Khandakar Golam Mortuza	177	0.1	N/A
Independent	Md. Ferdous Alam Khan	159	0.1	N/A
Majority		1,505	1.1	−14.8
Turnout		140,185	82.7	+24.1
AL gain from BNP				

General Election 1991: Pabna-2
Party	Candidate	Votes	%	±%
BNP	Osman Ghani Khan	67,431	55.3	
AL	Ahmed Tafiz Uddin	48,086	39.5	
Zaker Party	Md. A. Wahab	2,938	2.4	
NAP (Muzaffar)	Ronesh Moitra	1,050	0.9	
JP(E)	Mokbul Hossain	908	0.7	
Independent	Md. Hasan Monsoor	882	0.7	
NAP (Bhashani)	Md. Saudur Rahman	445	0.4	
NDP	Khandakar Golam Mortuza	100	0.1	
Majority		19,345	15.9	
Turnout		121,840	58.6	
BNP gain from JP(E)				
