= Handial Union =

Union council in Rajshahi Division, Bangladesh

Coordinates: 24.317°N 89.353°E

Handial Union is a union council in Chatmohar Upazila, Bangladesh. One of the village in the union council is Nobin village.
