= Pathorghata =

Village in Pabna District, Bangladesh

Coordinates: 24.1952°N 89.3873°E

Pathorghata is a village of Bhangura Upazila in Pabna District, Bangladesh. It is located in the southern part of Bhangura Upazila along the bank of Baral River.

== Geography ==
The land of this village is mainly flat land with a number of depressions called beel. The middle part of this village is higher than the rest of the parts. On the north the Baral River is flowing. A nearly extinguished river 'Mara Gang' is flowing across the village.

== Points of interest ==
Baral River bank, Pathorghata Islam o Shomaj Kalyan Gobeshona Kendro.

== Administration ==
Pathorghata is a village under the Per Bhangura Union. It comprises a number of parts: Maddha Para, Uttar Para, Paschim Para, Chakra Para, Bishi Para, Rokon Pur and Toltoli Para.

== See also ==
- List of villages in Bangladesh
