= Joy Pakistan =

Slogan in East Pakistan

Joy Pakistan (Bengali: জয় পাকিস্তান Bengali pronunciation: [dʒɔɪ̯ pɑːkɪst̪ɑːn]) was a slogan used in united Pakistan after 1947. It was the East Pakistani version of the slogan Pakistan Zindabad used in West Pakistan. Many political leaders of East Pakistan used this slogan in various meetings, gatherings, statements, and speeches.

== Controversy ==
In 2014, A. K. Khandker wrote in his book 1971: Bhitore Baire that Sheikh Mujibur Rahman said Joy Pakistan after saying Joy Bangla in his March 7 speech. This writing sparked widespread controversy among various groups, including leaders of the then-ruling Awami League government. In 2019, Khondkar officially apologized and described the information he had given as incorrect. Oli Ahad also expressed the same claim in his book.

In support of the claim that Joy Pakistan was said in the March 7 speech, Badruddin Umar expressed agreement in his book written in 1996, while Neelima Ibrahim disagreed in her book. Between 2011 and 2014, Pakistan’s High Commissioner to Bangladesh, Afrasiab Mehdi Hashmi, wrote in his book 1971 Fact and Fiction: Views and Perceptions in Pakistan, India and Bangladesh that Pakistan Zindabad, not Joy Pakistan, was said at the end of Sheikh Mujib’s March 7 speech. Pakistani writer Taj Hashmi also supported the opinion that Sheikh Mujib said Joy Pakistan on March 7. Haq Nawaz Akhtar showed the same view.

Humayun Ahmed said in the introduction to his book Jochona O Jononir Golpo, "The same thing is true of the famous speech of the Father of the Nation, Bangabandhu Sheikh Mujibur Rahman on March 7. In the first edition of Justice Muhammad Habibur Rahman's famous book Bangladesh Tarikh, he mentioned that at the end of the speech, Sheikh Mujibur Rahman said 'Joy Bangla. Joy Pakistan'. In the second edition, he omitted the part 'joy Pakistan'. In the autobiography written by poet Shamsur Rahman, which is serially published in the Daily Janakantha under the title 'Written in the Dust of Time', he also says that Sheikh Mujibur Rahman's last words were 'joy Pakistan'. I have heard such things from many others who are people of the Awami ideology. The problem is that I myself searched all the newspapers of March 8 and 9 and did not find any such information. Then why is a wrong idea being spread? If Bangabandhu said 'joy Pakistan', then there is nothing wrong with it. He must have thought about what he said. He said it with sincerity. He has to keep the path of dialogue open with Pakistan. He has to take his time. He was not in a position to declare war on March 7. I think Bangabandhu's March 7 speech is more important than the Gettysburg Address. It is not permissible to have any ambiguity here."

Ajoy Roy and his son Abhijit Roy held the opposite view.

It is mentioned in weekly newspaper Desh, vol 38 part 3 of 1971 disagreed with the claim. Raisuddin Arif agreed that Mujib uttered Joy Pakistan. Muhammad Hannan also supported this. Khandakar Kamrul Huda disagreed this claim.

== See also ==
- Joy Bangla
