= Bangladesh Mathematical Society =

Mathematical society in Bangladesh

- Formation: 1972
- Type: Mathematical society
- Headquarters: Dhaka, Bangladesh
- Region served: Bangladesh
- Official language: Bengali
- Website: www.bdmathsociety.org

The Bangladesh Mathematical Society (Bengali: বাংলাদেশ গণিত সমিতি) is a learned society of mathematicians in Bangladesh.

== History ==
The Bangladesh Mathematical Society was established in 1972. In 1974, the society started organising annual national mathematical conferences. It also publishes the GANIT: Journal of Bangladesh Mathematical Society. In the 1980s they voluntarily worked with the National Curriculum and Textbook Board to rewrite the mathematics textbook in Bangladesh. S. M. Azizul Haque, the head of the mathematics department of Dhaka University, was the first president of the society.

== List of former presidents ==
- Sajeda Banu (2016-2017)
- Nurul Alam Khan (2020-2021)
- Md. Shahidul Islam (2022-2023)
