= A. B. Mirza Azizul Islam =

Bangladeshi bureaucrat

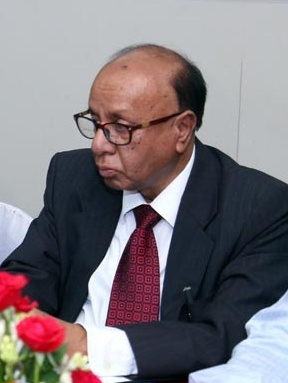
- Islam in 2016.

Advisor of the Caretaker Government
- In office 2007–2008
- Minister: Ministry of Finance, Ministry of Planning, Ministry of Commerce, Ministry of Post and Telecommunications

Personal details
- Parent: Mirza Abdur Rashid (father)

A. B. Mirza Azizul Islam is a Bangladeshi bureaucrat and a former advisor of the Caretaker government led by Fakhruddin Ahmed. He was in charge of the finance ministry.

== Biography ==
Islam was born to Mirza Abdur Rashid on 23 February 1941 in Durgapur village of what is now Sujanagar Upazila, Pabna District, Bangladesh. He was one of five brothers and three sisters. He graduated from Khalilpur High School and Dhaka College. He earned a bachelor's and a master's degree in economics at the University of Dhaka. Then he went to the United States, where he completed a second master's in development economics from Williams College and earned his PhD at Boston University.

Islam is the former chairman of the Bangladesh Securities and Exchange Commission.
