= Azizul Huq Arzu =

Bangladeshi politician

- খন্দকার আজিজুল হক আরজু

Member of the Bangladesh Parliament for Pabna-2
- In office 29 January 2014 – 28 January 2019
- Preceded by: A. K. Khandker
- Succeeded by: Ahmed Firoz Kabir

Personal details
- Born: 7 April 1958 (age 68)
- Party: Bangladesh Awami League

Azizul Huq Arzu (born 7 April 1958) is a Bangladesh Awami League politician and a former Jatiya Sangsad member representing the Pabna-2 constituency during 2014–2019.

== Early life ==
Arzu was born on 7 April 1958. He has a master's degree in communication.

== Career ==
Arzu served as the chairman of Bera Upazila.

On 5 January 2014, Arzu was elected unopposed as a member of Jatiya Sangsad from the Pabna-2 constituency in the 2014 Bangladeshi general election as an Awami League candidate. The Bangladesh Nationalist Party and Bangladesh Jamaat-e-Islami boycotted the election.

In 2016, Arzu was accused by the Bangladesh Election Commission of violating an electoral code. He held an event at Dhobakhola Coronation High School and College in Bera Upazila closing the school for three days in September 2018. The school was littered with rotten food leftover from the event. He was a member of the parliamentary standing committee on Fisheries and Livestock Ministry. He allegedly grabbed a land in Pabna illegally which belonged to the Roads and Highways Department (RHD).

On 14 September 2026, Arzu was arrested in Mohammadpur, Dhaka by Dhaka Metropolitan Police. He was detained by activists of the Jatiyatabadi Chhatra Dal, student wing of the ruling Bangladesh Nationalist Party. He was injured by the activists and sent to a hospital under police custody.
