= Wazi Uddin Khan =

Bangladeshi politician (1936–2020)

Member of Parliament for Pabna-3
- In office 1986–1988
- Preceded by: Jamshed Ali
- Succeeded by: A. K. M. Shamsuddin
- In office 1996–2001
- Preceded by: Saiful Azam
- Succeeded by: K. M. Anowarul Islam

Personal details
- Born: 20 February 1936 Vajpara, Pabna, British India
- Died: 31 January 2020 (aged 83) Atua Housepara, Pabna, Bangladesh
- Party: Bangladesh Awami League

Wazi Uddin Khan (Bengali: ওয়াজি উদ্দিন খান; 20 February 1936 – 31 January 2020) was a Bangladeshi freedom fighter and politician from Pabna belonging to Bangladesh Awami League. He was elected twice as a member of the Jatiya Sangsad.

== Biography ==
Khan was born on 20 February 1936 at Vajpara in Pabna. He took part in the Liberation War of Bangladesh in 1971.

Khan was elected as the general secretary of Pabna District Motor Workers' Union in 1972. He was elected as the president of the Bangladesh Road Transport Workers' Federation in 1980 and served in that post till his death.

Khan served as the president of Pabna District unit of Bangladesh Awami League for 25 years. He was elected as a member of the Jatiya Sangsad from Pabna-3 in 1986. He was also elected from that constituency in the Seventh Jatiya Sangsad Election.

Khan died on 31 January 2020 at his own residence at Atua Housepara in Pabna at the age of 83.
