= AKM Salim Reza Habib =

Bangladeshi politician

A K M Selim Reza Habib
- এ কে এম সেলিম রেজা হাবিব

Member of the Bangladesh Parliament for Pabna-2
- Incumbent
- Assumed office 17 February 2026
- Preceded by: Ahmed Firoz Kabir
- In office 19 March 1996 – 30 March 1996
- Preceded by: Osman Ghani Khan
- Succeeded by: Ahmed Tafiz Uddin

Personal details
- Party: Bangladesh Nationalist Party

A K M Selim Reza Habib is a Bangladesh Nationalist Party politician and the incumbent Jatiya Sangsad member representing the Pabna-2 constituency.

== Career ==
A K M Selim Reza Habib was elected to parliament from Pabna-2 as a Bangladesh Nationalist Party candidate in 2001. He stood unsuccessfully for the same seat in 1996, 2008, and 2018.
