= Ahmed Tafiz Uddin =

Bangladeshi politician

- আহমেদ তফিজ উদ্দিন

Member of Bangladesh Parliament

Personal details
- Died: June 1998
- Party: Bangladesh Awami League

Ahmed Tafiz Uddin (Bengali: আহমেদ তফিজ় উদ্দিন; died June 1998) was a Bangladesh Awami League politician and a member of parliament for Pabna-2.

== Career ==
Uddin was elected to parliament from Pabna-2 as a Bangladesh Awami League candidate in 1996.

== Death ==
Uddin died in June 1998. His son, Ahmed Firoz Kabir, was elected to parliament from his seat in 2018.
