= Mokbul Hossain (Pabna-2 politician) =

Bangladeshi politician

- মোকবুল হসেন

Member of Bangladesh Parliament

Personal details
- Born: Md. Mokbul Hossain; 30 June 1943 Pabna
- Died: 28 August 2021 (aged 78) Pabna District, Bangladesh
- Party: Jatiya Party (Ershad)
- Education: Dhaka University
- Occupation: Politician

Mokbul Hossain (Bengali:মোকবুল হসেন), also known as Maqbul Hossain Santu, was Jatiya Party (Ershad) politician and a member of parliament for Pabna-2. He was a presidium of the Jatiya Party (Ershad).

== Career ==
Hossain fought in the Bangladesh Liberation War.

Hossain was elected to parliament from Pabna-2 as a Jatiya Party candidate in 1986. He was re-elected in 1988. He served as the chairperson of the Pabna District Council.

== Death ==
Hossain died on 28 August 2021 in Shimla Hospital and Diagnostic Center in Pabna District, Bangladesh. He was buried in Arifpur graveyard.
