= Muhammad Abdul Hye =

Bengali educationist, linguist and writer

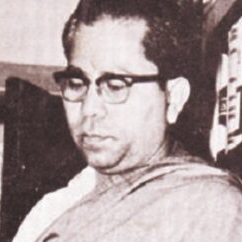
- Born: 26 November 1919; Maricha, Raninagar thana, Bengal Presidency, British India
- Died: 3 June 1969 (aged 49); Dacca, East Pakistan, Pakistan
- Education: University of Dacca

Muhammad Abdul Hye (26 November 1919 – 3 June 1969) also known as Muhammad Abdul Hai was a Bengali educationist, litterateur, researcher and linguist who was and is remembered as a notable figure in the Bengali language movement. He was awarded Bangla Academy Literary Award in 1961 and Ekushey Padak in 1996 by the government of Bangladesh.

== Biography ==
Hye was born on 26 November 1919 in Maricha, Raninagar thana, Murshidabad district, British India. His father was Abdul Ghani, and his mother was Maimunnessa Khatun. He studied at Bardhanpur Junior Madrasah until 1932, then at Rajshahi High Madrasah until 1936. He married Begum Anisa.

Hye completed an IA at Dacca Islamic Intermediate College in 1938. At the University of Dacca, he earned a BA (honours) in Bengali in 1941, and an MA in 1942, placing first in first class for both.

In 1942, he began teaching at the secondary level at Dacca Islamic Intermediate College. The following year, he became a lecturer in Bengali at Krishnagar Government College.

After the partition of India, he transferred to Rajshahi Government College in 1947. On 2 March 1949, he joined Dacca University as a lecturer in Bengali. In 1950, he went to England to study at the School of Oriental and African Studies. There he received a second MA in 1952 for his thesis, A Phonetic and Phonological Study of Nasal and Nasalization in Bengali.

Back at the University of Dacca, he was promoted to reader and head of the Department of Bengali and Sanskrit in 1954. In 1961, he received the Bangla Academy Award for his research. From September 1968 to January 1969, he was a visiting professor at Missouri University in the United States.

Hye died on 3 June 1969 when he was struck by a train while walking across the tracks at Gulbagh in Dacca. He was survived by his wife, two sons, and five daughters.

Muhammad Abdul Hye, once famously remarked that Bengali was the "French language of the East". He was referring to not only the sweetness of the language, but also the profound use of connotation, pronunciation and the subtlety of the language.

== Works ==
- Sahitya O Sanskriti (literature and culture) (1954)
- Bilete Sare Satsho Din (750 days in England) (1958)
- Toshamod O Rajneetir Bhasha (flattery and the language of politics) (1959)
- Bhasha O Sahitya (language and literature) (1960)
- Dhwanivigyan O Bangla Dhwanitatto (phonetics and Bengali phonology) (1964)

Hye produced Bangla Sahityer Itibritto (history of Bengali literature modern period) jointly with Syed Ali Ahsan. He produced and published books in association with Ahmed Sharif, Muhammad Mansuruddin, Anisuzzaman and Anwar Pasha.
