= Ahmed Firoz Kabir =

Bangladeshi politician

- আহমেদ ফিরোজ় কবির

Member of the Bangladesh Parliament for Pabna-2
- In office 30 January 2019 – 6 August 2024
- Preceded by: Azizul Huq Arzu
- Succeeded by: AKM Salim Reza Habib

Personal details
- Born: 26 July 1963 (age 63)
- Party: Bangladesh Awami League

Ahmed Firoz Kabir (Bengali: আহমেদ ফিরোজ় কবির; born 26 July 1963) is a Bangladesh Awami League politician and a former member of Jatiya Sangsad representing the Pabna-2 constituency.

== Career ==
Kabir was selected to parliament from Pabna-2 as a Bangladesh Awami League candidate on 30 December 2018. He was re-elected in 2024 and served until the July Revolution.
