= Chatmohar Upazila =

Chatmohar চাটমোহর
- Upazila of Bangladesh
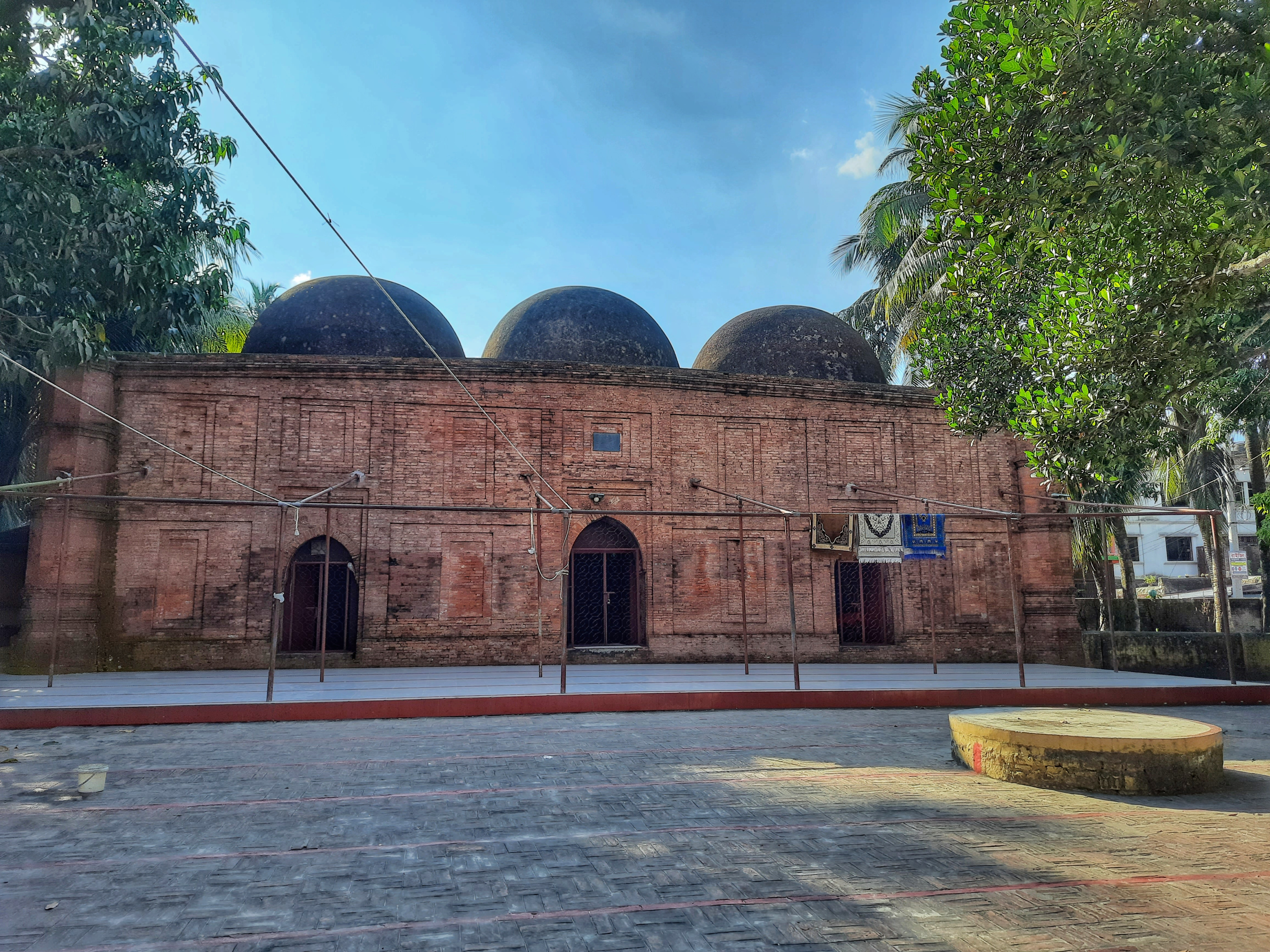
- Chatmohar Shahi Mosque

- Coordinates: 24°13.5′N 89°17.5′E
- Country: Bangladesh
- Division: Rajshahi
- District: Pabna

Area
  - Total: 310.10 km^{2} (119.73 sq mi)

Population (2022)
  - Total: 334,240
  - Density: 1,077.8/km^{2} (2,791.6/sq mi)
- Time zone: UTC+6 (BST)
- Postal code: 6630
- Area code: 07324
- Website: Official map of Chatmohar

Chatmohar Upazila mauza geocode map

Chatmohar (Bengali: চাটমোহর) is an upazila of Pabna District in the Division of Rajshahi, Bangladesh.

== Geography ==
Chatmohar is located at 24.2250°N 89.2917°E. It has a total area of 310.10 km^{2}.

== Demographics ==
Religions in Chatmohar Upazila (2022)
Religion	Percent
Islam	96.14%
Hinduism	3.10%
Christianity	0.69%
Other or not stated	0.07%

According to the 2022 Bangladeshi census, Chatmohar Upazila had 90,904 households and a population of 334,240. 8.80% of the population were under 5 years of age. Chatmohar had a literacy rate (age 7 and over) of 70.12%: 71.57% for males and 68.71% for females, and a sex ratio of 97.67 males for every 100 females. 66,360 (19.85%) lived in urban areas.

According to the 2011 Census of Bangladesh, Chatmohar Upazila had 70,260 households and a population of 291,121. 67,559 (23.21%) were under 10 years of age. Chatmohar had a literacy rate (age 7 and over) of 45.57%, compared to the national average of 51.8%, and a sex ratio of 1010 females per 1000 males. 14,443 (4.96%) lived in urban areas.

As of the 1991 Bangladesh census, Chatmohar has a population of 227524. Males constitute are 50.63% of the population, and females 49.37%. This Upazila's eighteen up population is 109774. Chatmohar has an average literacy rate of 24.1% (7+ years), and the national average of 32.4% literate.

== Administration ==
Chatmohar Upazila is divided into Chatmohar Municipality and 11 union parishads: Bilchalan, Chhaikhola, Danthia Bamangram, Failjana, Gunaigachha, Handial, Haripur, Mothurapur, Mulgram, Nimaichara, and Parshadanga. The union parishads are subdivided into 170 mauzas and 236 villages.

Chatmohar Municipality is subdivided into 9 wards and 13 mahallas.

Chairman: Mirza Rezaul Korim (Dulal Mirza)

Vice Chairman: Md Saidul Islam

Woman Vice Chairman: Firoza Parvin

Upazila Nirbahi Officer (UNO): Musa Nasir Chowdhury

Political Leaders:- 1.Mirza Rezaul Korim (Dulal Mirza)

2.K.M.Anwarul Islam

3.Mirza Abu Hayat Mohammad Kamal (Jewel Mirza)

4.Hasibul Hasan Hira

5. Adv. Shakhawat Hossain Shakho

6.Nazim Uddin Mia

== Education ==
Primary schools:

- Afrat Para Govt. Primary School
- Chatmohar Model Primary School
- D A Joyen Uddin School
- Bahadurpur Government Primary School
- Orbital Link school And college

Schools:

- Orbital Link school And college
- Ashraf Zindani High School, Shomaj
- Mohela BL High School
- Chatmohar RCN and BSN High School
- Handiyal High School
- Mulgram Union High School
- Parshawdanga High School
- Bamongram High School
- Nimaichora High School
- Chatmohar Model High School
- Chatmohar Pilot Girls High School
- Chiknai High School
- Atlongka High School
- Saint Rita's High School
- Failjana High School
- Panchuria high School
- Chaikola High School
- Chalanbill High School
- Paramount International School

Colleges:

- Chatmohar Degree College
- Chatmohar Women's College
- Chatmohar Technical and Business Management Institute
- Atlongka Degree College
- Handiyal College
- M.A Samad BM School And College
- Chaikhola Degree College
- Professor Boyen Uddin Degree College
- Mirzapur Degree College
- Mahmud Ali Degree College

Madrashas:

- Enayet ullah Fazil Madrasa
- Samad Sawda Dhakhil Madrasha
- Boyaiimary Dhakhil Madrasha
- Kuabashi Dakhil Madrasah
- Charikol Pukurpar Dakhil Madrasah

Polytechnic institutes:

- Chatmohar Polytechnic Institute

== Notable residents ==
- Pramatha Chaudhuri, writer, spent his first five years at Haripur village.
- K. M. Anowarul Islam was member of parliament for constituency Pabna-3 from 2001 until 2008.

== See also ==
- Upazilas of Bangladesh
- Districts of Bangladesh
- Divisions of Bangladesh
