= Pagla Kanai =

Bengali philosopher and mystic poet (1803–1892)

- পাগলা কানাই
- Born: Kanai Sheikh; 8 March 1809; Labutala Madhabpur village, Jhenaidah District, Bengal Presidency, British India
- Died: 12 July 1889 (aged 80)

Pagla Kanai (8 March 1809 – 12 July 1889) was a Bengali mystic folk singer. His songs were in the genre of Jari, Dhua, Pala Gaan, Kobi Gaan, Murshidi, Marfati and Islamic. He was notable for developing a Jari form, called Dhuajari, in which an incident is narrated in a rhythmic tone. He was contemporary of another folk singer Lalon.

== Early life ==
Kanai was born as Kanai Sheikh to Kuron Sheikh and Momena Khatun in Jhenaidah District. He had two younger siblings, Uzzal Sheikh and Shornari. Afterh the death of his father, Momena moved to a relative's house at Chewniya village, Kaliganj Upazila. Kanai and Uzzal took up jobs as cowherds at the resident of Bhoros Mandal at Balarampur village, Harinakunda Upazila. Later, their sister Shornari took them to her husband's house.

Kanai took a job as an indigo worker at the factory of the Chakrobarty family in Atharokhada, Magura District. He left the job soon after and toured around the country.

== Legacy ==
Scholars including Mohammad Mansuruddin, Mazharul Islam, Abu Talib, Amin Uddin Shah, Durga Das Lahiri and Upendranath Bhattacharya collected Kanai's songs and conducted research on his life. Mazharul Islam included 240 of the songs in his book, Kobi Pagla Kanai (1959).

A 3-day folk festival is held on Kanai's birth anniversary, organized by Pagla Kanai Smriti Shangrakkhan Shangshad (PKSSS) in Berbari village, Jhenaidah District.
