= Faridpur Upazila =

Faridpur ফরিদপুর
- Upazila of Bangladesh
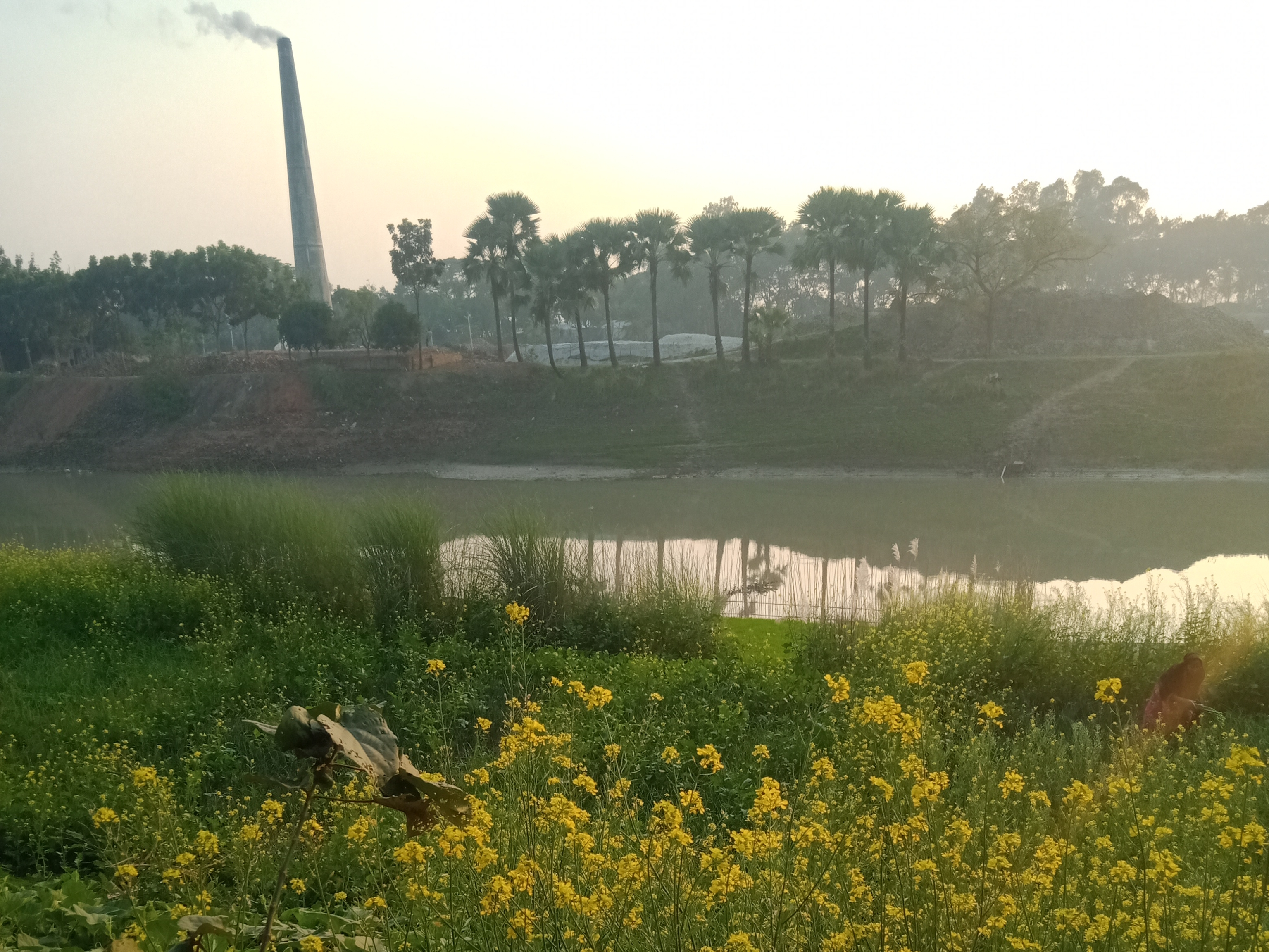
- Mustard fields beside a riverside brick kiln in Chadpur village, Faridpur Upazila, Pabna

- Coordinates: 24°9.5′N 89°27.2′E
- Country: Bangladesh
- Division: Rajshahi
- District: Pabna

Area
  - Total: 137.67 km^{2} (53.15 sq mi)

Population (2022)
  - Total: 140,399
  - Density: 1,019.8/km^{2} (2,641.3/sq mi)
- Time zone: UTC+6 (BST)
- Postal code: 6650
- Website: Official Map of Faridpur

Faridpur Upazila mauza geocode map

Faridpur (Bengali: ফরিদপুর) is an upazila of Pabna District in the Division of Rajshahi, Bangladesh. Faridpur is located at 24.1583°N 89.4528°E.

== Demographics ==
Religions in Faridpur Upazila (2022)
Religion	Percent
Islam	97.06%
Hinduism	2.94%
Other or not stated	0.00%

According to the 2022 Bangladeshi census, Faridpur Upazila had 35,419 households and a population of 140,399. 9.65% of the population were under 5 years of age. Faridpur had a literacy rate (age 7 and over) of 67.59%: 68.48% for males and 66.73% for females, and a sex ratio of 97.22 males for every 100 females. 20,474 (14.58%) lived in urban areas.

According to the 2011 Census of Bangladesh, Faridpur Upazila had 30,845 households and a population of 130,335. 30,475 (23.38%) were under 10 years of age. Faridpur had a literacy rate (age 7 and over) of 42.53%, compared to the national average of 51.8%, and a sex ratio of 1004 females per 1000 males. 14,010 (10.75%) lived in urban areas.

As of the 1991 Bangladesh census, Faridpur has a population of 111,464. Males constitute 51.44% of the population, and females 48.56%. This Upazila's eighteen up population is 52,699. Faridpur has an average literacy rate of 26.3% (7+ years), and the national average of 32.4% literate.

== Administration ==
Faridpur Upazila is divided into Faridpur Municipality and six union parishads: Banwarinagar, Brilahiribari, Demra, Faridpur, Hadal, and Pungali. The union parishads are subdivided into 56 mauzas and 87 villages.

Faridpur Municipality is subdivided into 9 wards and 16 mahallas.

== See also ==
- Upazilas of Bangladesh
- Districts of Bangladesh
- Divisions of Bangladesh
