= Bhangura Upazila =

Upazila in Rajshahi Division, Bangladesh

Bhangura ভাঙ্গুড়া
- Upazila of Bangladesh
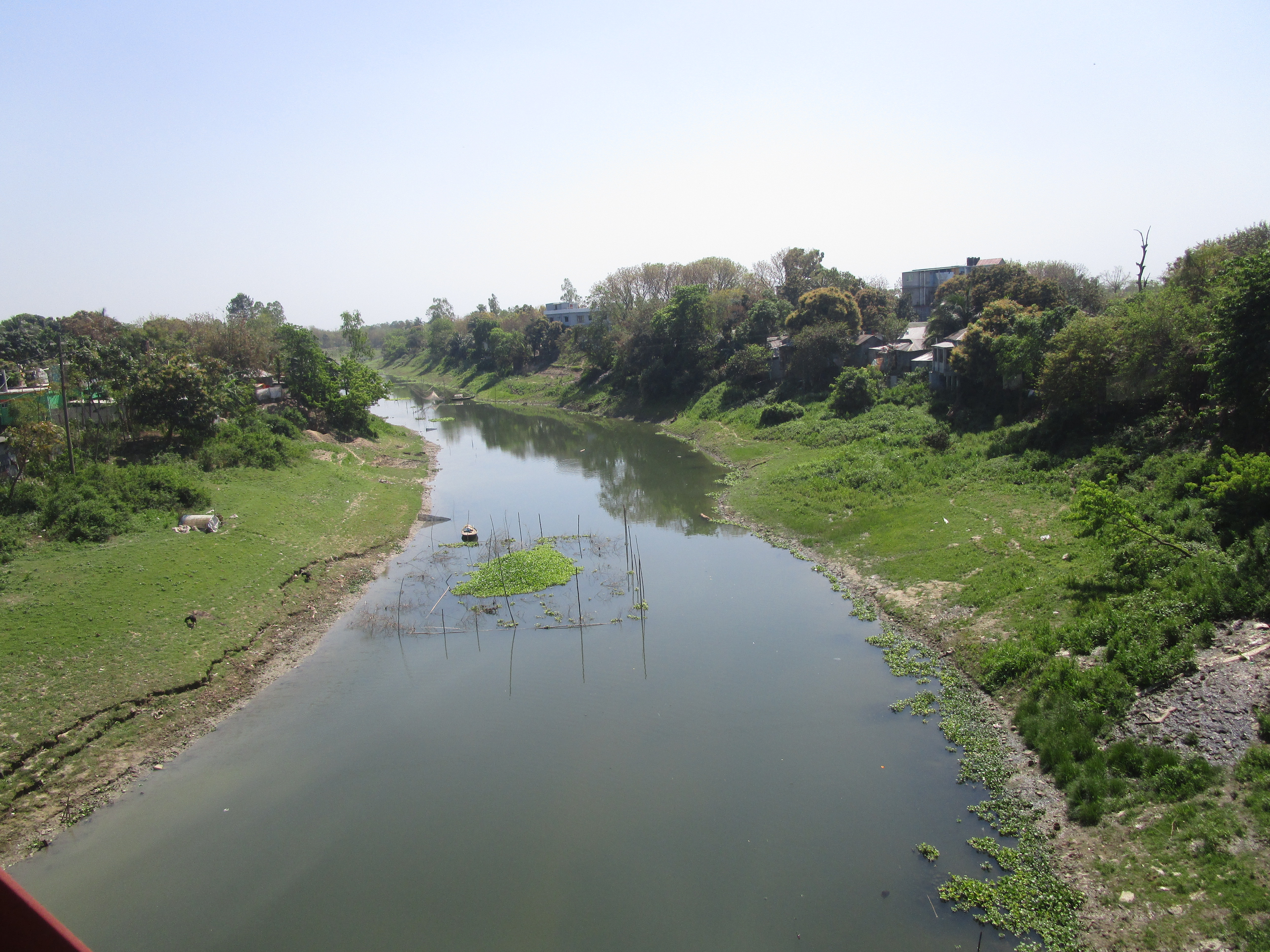
- Boral River at Bhangura

- Coordinates: 24°13.5′N 89°24′E
- Country: Bangladesh
- Division: Rajshahi
- District: Pabna

Area
  - Total: 138.36 km^{2} (53.42 sq mi)

Population (2022)
  - Total: 136,576
  - Density: 987.11/km^{2} (2,556.6/sq mi)
- Time zone: UTC+6 (BST)
- Postal code: 6640
- Website: bhangura.pabna.gov.bd

Bhangura Upazila mauza geocode map

Bhangura (Bengali: ভাঙ্গুড়া, romanized: Bhāṅguṛā) or Bhangoora is an upazila of Pabna District in Rajshahi Division, Bangladesh.

== History ==
Bhangura thana was established in 1980 and was turned into an upazila in 1981. Once Bhangura upazila was a noted jute growing area. For this reason a jute trading company called Chittagong Jute Company established business house on the bank of the river adjacent to the Baral Bridge. Still there exist a house of the extinct company.

=== Liberation War ===
During the Bangladesh Liberation War, several encounters between the Pakistan Army supported by Razakars against the Mukti Bahini were made at Baral Bridge and Dilpashar Bridge. A number of Razakars surrendered. Commander Abdul Hannan and Aslamul Islam led the Mukti Bahini.

Abu Muhammad Yunus Ali was elected Member of Legislative Assembly (MLA) from Atgharia-Chatmohor-Faridpur constituency of Pabna district. He was nominated by Awami League in the United Front election in 1954, and became the founder and main leader of the Awami League party politics in that area. He was also a popular language soldier, a close associate of Bangabandhu in the six-point demand movement, and an organizer of the 1971 Liberation War. He was a close friend of Bangabandhu Sheikh Mujibur Rahman, his only roommate in Baker Hostel in Kolkata, a classmate at Dhaka University and also a trusted political companion.

Abu Muhammad Yunus Ali served as an organizer of the liberation war in Shahzadpur, Baghabari, Nagarbari and in the remote areas of Chalanbil of Greater Pabna district in 1971, and was wounded in a battlefield. At one stage, members of Razakar-Al-Badr (Note: Two groups that collaborated with Pakistan Army, these groups were also known for committing war crimes against Bengalis.) tortured him in an inhuman manner, and even destroyed his ancestral homestead at Sartutia of Bhangura upazila. In 1972, after the government treatment of his injury under the supervision of Bangabandhu, he gained limited mobility after surgery. On February 14, 2005, the “People’s MLA Yunus” died in his house at Bhangura.

== Geography ==
Bhangura is located at 24.2250°N 89.4000°E. It has 28,853 households and total area 138.36 km^{2}. It is bounded by Tarash upazila on the north, Faridpur (Pabna) upazila on the south, Ullapara upazila on the east, Chatmohar upazila on the west. The upazila is criss-crossed by two rivers named the Baral and the Gumani. The western part of this upazila is relatively higher than the eastern part which comprises a part of the great Chalan Bil. A very large number of small bills are also available in this area. The people here like the simple life.

== Demographics ==
Religions in Bhangura Upazila (2022)
Religion	Percent
Islam	96.64%
Hinduism	3.34%
Other or not stated	0.02%

According to the 2022 Bangladeshi census, Bhangura Upazila had 33,923 households and a population of 136,576. 9.29% of the population were under 5 years of age. Bhangura had a literacy rate (age 7 and over) of 67.88%: 69.61% for males and 66.25% for females, and a sex ratio of 95.68 males for every 100 females. 37,057 (27.13%) lived in urban areas.

According to the 2011 Census of Bangladesh, Bhangura Upazila had 28,853 households and a population of 124,433. 29,360 (23.60%) were under 10 years of age. Bhangura had a literacy rate (age 7 and over) of 43.98%, compared to the national average of 51.8%, and a sex ratio of 1010 females per 1000 males. 20,606 (16.56%) lived in urban areas.

At the 2001 Bangladesh census, Bhangura had a population of 99,474 of which 50,486 were male and 48,988 were female. Average density of population was 731 per square kilometre. It had an average literacy rate of 38.3% (7+ years).

Main Occupations Agriculture but, agricultural labourer, wage labourer, commerce, service, fishing and others also present.

== Economy ==
Total cultivable land 10,460 hectares, fallow land 2,786 hectares; single crop 36%, double crop 40% and triple crop 24%. Main crops include paddy, jute, wheat, onion, garlic, green chilly, khesari, musur and patal commonly grown fruits are Banana, mango, jackfruit, black berry, papaya and litchi.

Bhangura upazila is notable for its milk and milk products. A considerable number of people are involved in production of milk products that include butter, chern, chhana, etc. These products as well as their raw materials are sent to different parts of Bangladesh.

== Points of interest ==
A part of Chalan Beel passes through the northern part of the Upazila. It has an Upazila Parishad including a Dak bungalow, a playground at Chandipur Bazar, Twin ponds at Chandipur bazar called Boro dighi and Soto dighi, three-domed mosque at Kazipara (Chandipur), Baral Bridge, Boro Bil, Pathorghata, four-storied Jame Mosque, Patul Playground, Patul Excursion Beach Sonali Beach, Nobi bari , Baonjan Dhow.

== Administration ==
Bhangura Upazila is divided into Bhangura Municipality and six union parishads: Austa Manisha, Bhangura, Dilpashar, Khanmarich, Parbhanguria and Mondotush union. The union parishads are subdivided into 67 mauzas and 122 villages.

Bhangura Municipality is subdivided into 9 wards and 37 mahallas.

Member of the Parliament (MP): Ali Asgar (Pabna-3 constitution)

Chairman: আতাউর রহমান

Vice Chairman: Vacant

Woman Vice Chairman: Vacant

Upazila Nirbahi Officer (UNO): Tapas Pal

Bhangura Paurashava Mayor: Vacant

== Transport ==
Roads pucca 13km, semi pucca 4km and mud road 210km; waterways 17-nautical-mile (31 km); railways 11km. Bus and train are the most popular means of transport for communication with other parts of the country.

There are three railway stations in this upazila: Baral Bridge, Bhangura and Sharatnagar. Baral Bridge is the most prominent one, where several intercity trains have stoppage, which are: Silk City, Lalmoni, Dhumketu, Sundarban, Chitra etc.

Bus services are: Shahzadpur Travels (Bhangura-Dhaka), Syamoli Paribahan (Bhangura-Chittagong), Uttara Paribahan (Bhangura-Rajshahi), B-Nagar (Bhangura-Bogra) and direct bus services also exist from Bhangura to Pabna, Ishurdi, Kushtia, Baghabari (Sirajgonj) etc.

Traditional transport Palanquin, dhuli, horse carriage and bullock cart. These means of transport are either extinct or nearly extinct.

== Education ==
There are two colleges in the upazila: Haji Jamal Uddin Degree College, founded in 1970, and Bhangura Women's College (1998). The former is the only honors level one.

According to Banglapedia, Bhangura Union High School, Bhangura Jarina Rahim Girls High School, founded in 1969, and Hasina-Momin Girls' High School (1972) are notable secondary schools.

The madrasa education system includes two fazil madrasas: Sharatnagar Fazil Madrasa(1927), and Haji Gayez Uddin Women's Fazil Madrasa (1985).
