= K. M. Anowarul Islam =

Bangladeshi politician

Member of Bangladesh Parliament

Personal details
- Party: Bangladesh Nationalist Party

K. M. Anowarul Islam is a Bangladesh Nationalist Party politician and a former member of parliament for Pabna-3.

== Career ==
Islam was elected to parliament from Pabna-3 as a Bangladesh Nationalist Party candidate in 2001. In 2007, he was sent into jail for misappropriating a large number of corrugated iron sheets earmarked for relief.
