= Biswas =

Origin
- Origin: Bengali Hindu
- Region of origin: Bengal

Biswas (Bengali: বিশ্বাস) (pronounced in Bengali as "bish-shash") is a native Bengali surname, commonly used by the Bengali community of India and Bangladesh. The surname was an honorary title bestowed on persons who were relied upon for the work of accounts, receipts and expenditure. The word Biswas means faith or trust in Bengali.

The surname 'Biswas' is not tied to any specific religion or caste, as it is used by both "Hindus, including Brahmins, and Muslims alike". Among Bengali Hindus, the surname is notably associated with various castes, including Forward castes like Kayasthas, Mahishyas and Brahmins as well as Scheduled Castes like Poundras and Namasudras. The surname is also found among Bengali Muslims and Bengali Christians.

== Notable people ==
=== Academia and Science ===
- Biswamoy Biswas (1923–1994), Indian ornithologist
- Birendra Bijoy Biswas (1928–2018), Indian molecular biologist and recipient of the Shanti Swarup Bhatnagar Prize, the highest science award in India
- Indranil Biswas (born 1964), mathematician and recipient of the Shanti Swarup Bhatnagar Prize, the highest science award in India
- Kanishka Biswas (born 1982), chemist and recipient of the Shanti Swarup Bhatnagar Prize, the highest science award in India
- Pratim Biswas, Dean of the College of Engineering at the University of Miami
- Anindya Biswas (born 1982), Global Technology Leader, India, who specialises in the AI Innovation.

=== Arts and entertainment ===
- Chhabi Biswas (1900–1962), Bengali character actor
- Debabrata Biswas (1911–1980), Bengali singer
- Anil Biswas (composer) (1914–2003), Indian film music composer
- Hemanga Biswas, exponent of the Bhantiali folk music, originally popular among the fishermen of Bangladesh
- Pulak Biswas (born 1941), artist and children's book illustrator from India
- Sutapa Biswas (born 1962), British Indian conceptual artist
- Seema Biswas (born 1965), Indian film and theatre actress
- Apu Biswas, Bangladeshi actress who appears in Dhallywood films
- Soumili Biswas, Bengali television serial actress
- Timir Biswas (born 1982), playback singer, songwriter, composer and lead singer of the band Fakira

=== Business and industry ===
- Chowdhury Moyezuddin Biwshash (1840–1923), merchant and aristocrat
- Babu Gagan Chandra Biswas (1849–1936), industrialist, engineer, zamindar, politician and social worker
- Sanjit Biswas (born 1982), American entrepreneur and computer scientist

=== Military and exploration ===
- Suresh Biswas, 19th-century adventurer from India
- Mohammad Nurul Haque Biswas (1915–1998), army officer and politician
- Mohammad Sahiuddin Bishwas (1923–1990), freedom fighter and politician
- Suhas Biswas, first Air Force officer awarded the Ashoka Chakra

=== Politics and public service ===
- Yusuf Ali Bishwas (1905–1971), former Minister of Agriculture
- Raushan Ali Bishwas (1921–1994), former Governor of Jessore
- Charu Chandra Biswas, CIE, Indian judge, Union Minister and Vice Chancellor of the University of Calcutta
- Abdur Rahman Biswas (1926–2017), former president of Bangladesh
- AM Riasat Ali Biswas (1932–2016), Islamic scholar and politician
- Kamalakshi Biswas (1937–2025), Indian politician from West Bengal
- Anil Biswas (politician) (nickname Keru) (1944–2006), Indian politician
- Debabrata Biswas (politician) (born 1945), politician from All India Forward Bloc and a Member of the Parliament of India
- Shahidul Islam Biswas (1948–2006), former general secretary of Bangladesh Nationalist Party
- Nuruzzaman Biswas (born 1948), former MP of Pabna-4
- Abdul Gaffar Biswas (born 1949), former MP for Khulna-3
- Manjur Rahman Biswas (1950–2023), former MP of Pabna-4
- Abdul Latif Biswas (born 1953), Bangladeshi minister
- Mohammad Abdul Wadud Bishwas (born 1964), politician
- Md. Golam Mostofa Biswas (born 1967), former MP of Nawabganj-2
- Farhad Hossain Bishwas Dodul (born 1972), Minister of Public Administration
- Emani Biswas (born 1975), Trinamool politician
- Abdul Latif Biswas (1897–1964), Pakistani politician and former food and agriculture minister from East Pakistan
- Abdur Rasheed Biswas (died 1991), former MP of Jessore
- Ehteshamul Haq Nasim Biswas (died 1998), medical doctor and politician
- Kanti Biswas, Indian politician and former minister of West Bengal
- Lutfar Rahman Biswas, Bangladeshi politician
- Panjab Ali Biswas, former MP of Pabna-4
- U. N. Biswas, Indian Buddhist politician and former Minister for Backward Class Welfare from West Bengal
- Ujjal Biswas, Indian politician and present Minister for Technical Education in the Government of West Bengal
- Wajed Ali Biswas (1947–2003), politician and shrimp exporter

=== Reformers and activists ===
- Babu Mathurmohan Biswas (1817–1871), Indian zamindar, social reformer and religious patron
- Basanta Kumar Biswas (1895–1915), independence activist involved in the Jugantar
- Ramakrishna Biswas (1910–1931), Bengali revolutionary and martyr
- Abu Raihan Biswas (1940–2019), high school teacher and socialist
- Barun Biswas (1972–2012), Bengali school teacher and social activist

=== Sports ===
- Dipendu Biswas, Indian international football player
- Soma Biswas (born 1978), athlete of Kolkata, India, who specialises in the heptathlon

== See also ==
- A House for Mr. Biswas, 1961 novel by V. S. Naipaul.
