= Galibur Rahman Sherif =

Bangladeshi politician

Galibur Rahman Sharif

Member of the Bangladesh Parliament for Pabna-4
- In office 30 January 2024 – 6 August 2024
- Preceded by: Nuruzzaman Biswas
- Succeeded by: Md. Abu Taleb Mondol

Personal details
- Born: 7 June 1983 (age 43)
- Party: Awami League

Galibur Rahman Sharif (born 7 June 1983) is a Bangladeshi politician and a former member of the Jatiya Sangsad for the Pabna-4 constituency. His father, Shamsur Rahman Sharif, was a member of parliament and the minister of land.

== Personal life ==
Sharif was born on 7 June 1983 to Shamsur Rahman Sharif and Kamrunnahar Sharif. He studied at the University of Ulster, London, United Kingdom.

== Politics career ==
Sharif was a member of the Ishwardi Upazila Awami League. He was elected as a candidate of the Awami League in the 12th national parliament election on 7 January 2024 and became a member of parliament for the Pabna-4 constituency.
