= Paksey =

Paksey পাকশী
- Town
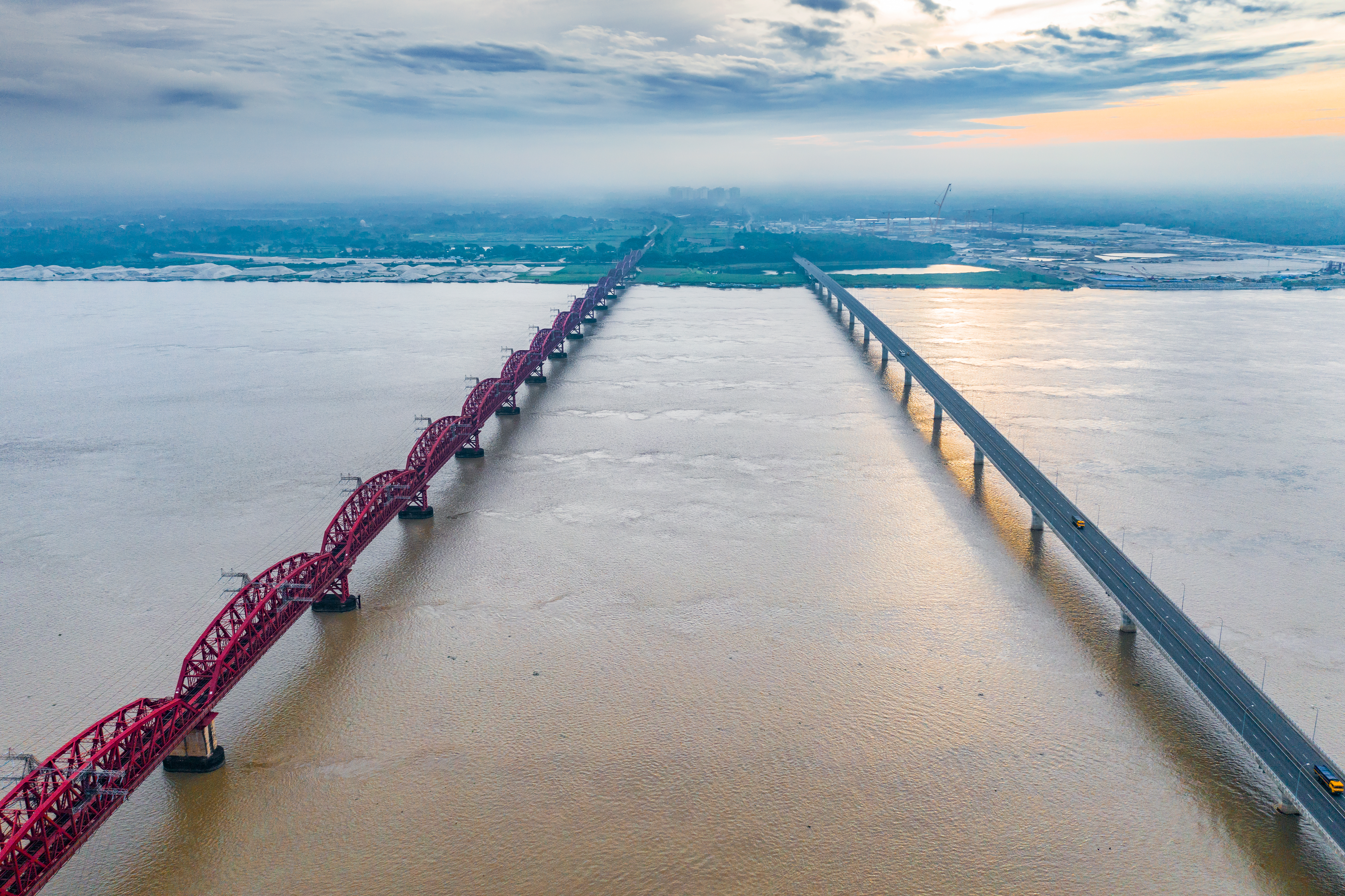
- Hardinge Bridge and Lalon Shah Bridge, situated over Padma river

- Location within Bangladesh
- Coordinates: 24°01′N 89°13′E
- Country: Bangladesh
- Division: Rajshahi Division
- District: Pabna District
- Upazila: Ishwardi Upazila
- Elevation: 16 m (52 ft)
- Time zone: UTC+6 (BST)

Paksey (Bengali: পাকশী, romanized: Pakshee) is a town situated on the banks of the Padma River in Ishwardi Upazila–the westernmost Upazila of Pabna District in Rajshahi Division, Bangladesh. Paksey is home to the Hardinge Bridge–a steel railway bridge named after Lord Hardinge who was the Viceroy of British India from 1910 to 1916. Paksey also serves as the western zone headquarters for the Bangladesh Railway. The road bridge, Lalon Shah Bridge, crosses the Padma at Paksey.

== Economy ==
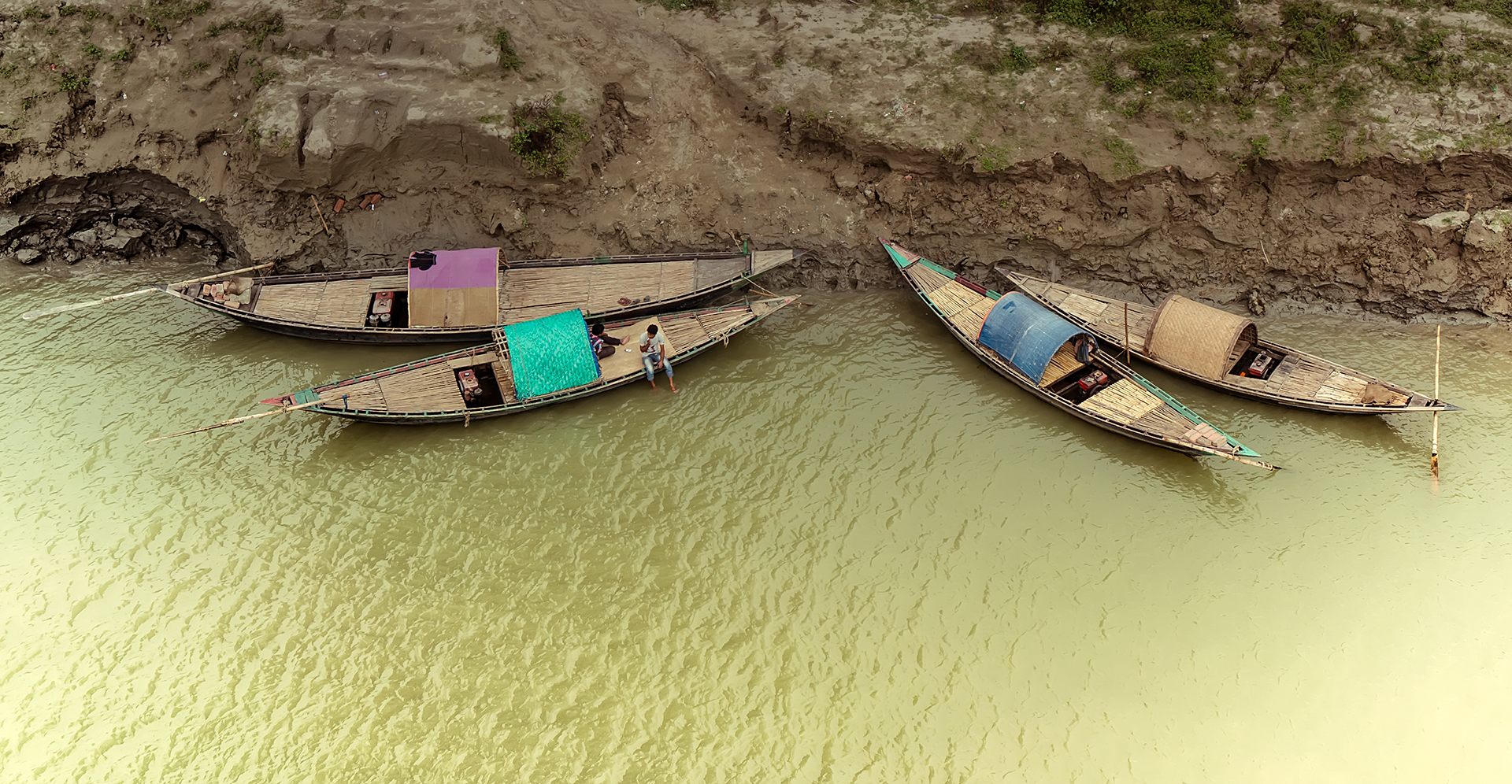
Paksey, Rajshahi

Ishwardi Export Processing Zone is situated at Paksey. North Bengal Paper Mills ceased operations in 2002.

== Transport ==
Paksey is on national highway N704, which connects to the east to the Pabna–Natore segment of national highway N6, and to the west across the Lalon Shah Bridge to Kushtia, about 27.5 kilometres (17.1 mi) south along the Padma River. Regional highway R603 runs northeast 6.5 kilometres (4.0 mi) to Ishwardi.

Paksey is the divisional headquarters of the Bangladesh Railway. Pakshi railway station is on the Chilahati–Parbatipur–Santahar–Darshana line. In June 2023, it was served by between 8 and 12 intercity trains a day. Hardinge Bridge carries the line across the Padma River just south of Paksey.

== Education ==
There are many educational institutions in Paksey.

Colleges

- Paksey Railway Degree College

Secondary schools

- Abul Hossin High School
- Baghail School and College
- Bangladesh Railway Government Chandraprabha Vidyapitha
- Bangladesh Railway Government Girl's High School
- North Bengal Paper Mills High school
- Ruppur Girls High School
- Ruppur High School, Ishwardi
- Sara Gopalpur High School
- Sara Jhaudia High School
