= Md. Abu Taleb Mondol =

Bangladeshi politician

- মোঃ আবু তালেব মন্ডল
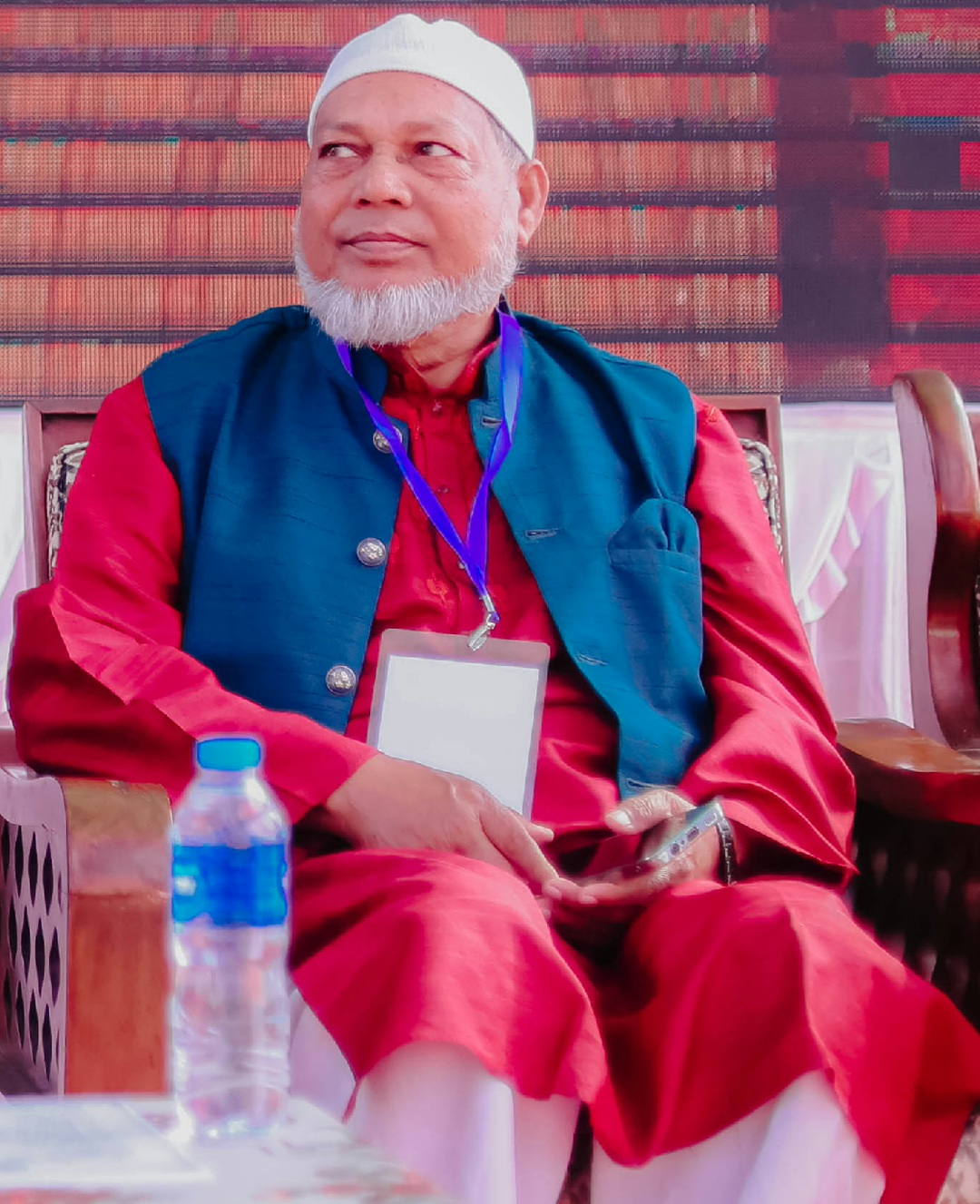
- Abu Taleb Mondal in 2026

Member of the Bangladesh Parliament for Pabna-4
- Incumbent
- Assumed office 17 February 2026
- Preceded by: Galibur Rahman Sherif

Personal details
- Born: November 25, 1958 (age 67)q Ishwardi Upazila, Pabna District
- Party: Bangladesh Jamaat-e-Islami

Md. Abu Taleb Mondol is a Bangladeshi politician of the Bangladesh Jamaat-e-Islami. He is currently serving as a member of parliament from Pabna-4.

== Early life ==
Mondol was born on 25 November 1958 in Ishwardi Upazila in Pabna District.
