= Amiya Bhushan Majumdar =

Indian Bengali litterateur (1918-2001)

Amita Bhusan Majumdar
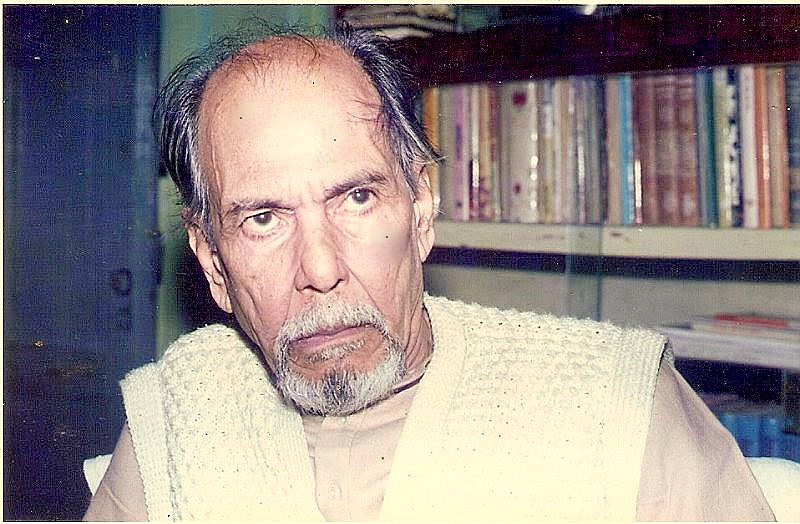
- Majumdar at his home
- Born: 22 March 1918; Cooch Behar District, Bengal Presidency, British India (now in West Bengal, India)
- Died: 8 July 2001 (aged 83); Kolkata, West Bengal, India
- Occupations: Writer, novelist, essayist, playwright
- Awards: Sahitya Academy Award (1986)

Amiya Bhushan Majumdar (Bengali: অমিয় ভূষণ মজুমদার) (22 March 1918 – 8 July 2001) was an Indian novelist, short-story writer, essayist and playwright. In a writing career spanning over four decades, Majumdar wrote numerous novels, short stories, plays and essays in Bengali. Known as the ‘Writer’s Writer’, Majumdar is considered one of the most noteworthy authors of modern Bengali prose. His works received significant critical acclaim and recognition – including the Sahitya Academi Award for his novel Rajnagar in 1986

== Early life ==
He was born to Babu Ananta Bhushan Majumdar (actual surname Bagchi) a Bengali Brahmin zamindar in Paksey, Ishwardi Upazila, Pabna, (now in Bangladesh) and Jyotirindu Devi. Though Jyotirindu Devi was also from a Barendra Brahmin family, she was highly influenced by the Brahmo Samaj and had close friends in the Coochbehar royal family. Amiya Bhushan was the eldest among the five sons of Ananta Bhushan and Jyotirindu Devi and had two elder sisters. He spent most of his life in the North Bengal district of Coochbehar.

== Education ==
Though he was an honours graduate in English, his command over Mathematics, History, Geography, Philosophy, Sanskrit and Law was enviable. This erudition has always reflected in the narratives he created. In 1937 he was enrolled in B. A. English honours class at the Scottish Church College, under the University of Calcutta. Owing to serious illness, he went back to Cooch Behar after a few months and got admitted to Victoria College (now Acharya Brojendra Nath Seal College). After earning his degree in 1939, he was compelled by circumstances to take up a job as a Graduate Clerk in the Coochbehar Head Post Office to support his family, drawing a full stop to what could have become a brilliant academic career.

== Literary career ==
Majumdar was an outstanding fiction writer in Bengali literature and a role model for many writers and creative artists, who avoided patronizing any quarter of the society. Although he lived in a district town at the northernmost part of the state, he produced literary masterpieces like, ‘Garh Shrikhanda’, ‘Mahishkurar Upakatha’, ‘Rajnagar’, ‘Madhu Sadhukhan’ ‘Friday Island’ and many more which were first published in little magazines with very limited circulation.

A website on his life and works has been launched on his 100th birthday : http://amiyabhushan.com/

== Awards and recognition ==
- In 1972, he was awarded the Tribritta Puraskar.
- In 1984, he received the Uttarbanga Sambad Sahitya Purashkar
- In 1986, the Government of West Bengal awarded him the Bankim Puraskar 1986 for fiction writing for his novel Rajnagar.
- In 1986, the Sahitya Akademi, India's national academy of letters awarded him the Sahitya Akademi Award for his novel Rajnagar.
- In 1997, he was awarded the Sarat Memorial Medal by the University of Calcutta.
- In 2000, he was awarded the Kanchenjunga Puraskar by Siliguri Press Club.
- In 2001, he was awarded an honorary D.Litt. by the University of Kalyani.
- In 2001, he was posthumously awarded an honorary D.Litt. by the University of North Bengal for his literary contributions.

Poet Jay Goswami wrote: "As a (classical) singer moves from note to note, Amiya Bhushan moved from sentence to sentence. It takes time for the reader to overcome the spell it creates and to adjust himself with the movement. It becomes a lesson to new writers" and "Amiya Bhushan was an inventor of new lands and has taught how to appreciate achievements with a highly sophisticated self restrain."

In 2006-2007 Central Institute of Indian Languages produced a 30 mins documentary film on him under the project named Bhasha Mandakini. The name of the film is: Makers of Bangla Literature:Amiya Bhusan Majumdar, Directed by Indranil Sen.

== Works ==
- Amiyabhushan Rachana Samagra, Volumes 1 to 11 (Collected Works of Amiya Bhushan Majumdar, Volumes 1 to 11)

=== Major novels ===
- Garh Shrikhanda (গড় শ্রীখন্ড)
- Mahishkurar Upakatha (মহিষকুড়ার উপকথা)
- Rajnagar (রাজনগর)
- Madhu Sadhukhan (মধু সাধুখাঁ)
- Friday Island Othoba Noromangsho Bhokkhon Ebong Tahar Por
- Chandbene
- Tashilar Mayor
- Bishwa Mittirer Prithhibi
- Nirbaas
- Bilash Binoy Bandana
- New Calcutta

== Other interests ==
Majumdar loved what he called "playing with colours and brush" and this 'play' has given birth to many a thought provoking oil painting. He deeply loved Indian Classical Music and was a great fan of Pundit Omkarnath Thakur and Ustad Vinayakrao Patavardhan.

== See also ==
- Subimal Mishra
