= Mozid Mahmud =

Bangladeshi poet (born 1966)

- Born: 16 April 1966 (age 60); Pabna
- Occupation: Writer
- Writing career
- Genres: Poetry, journalism
- Subject: Literature
- Website: mozidmahmud.com

Mozid Mahmud (Bengali: মজিদ মাহমুদ; born 16 April 1966) is a Bangladeshi poet, journalist, and essayist. He is recognized as a major poet of the 1980s, with more than sixty books to his credit.

== Biography ==
Mozid Mahmud is the pen name of MD Abdul Mozid. He was born in 1966 at Chargorgori, a village thirteen kilometres west of Pabna, to the family of Mohammad Keramat Ali Biswas and Sanowara Begum.

=== Education ===
He completed his early education in the local school and college. In 1986, he crossed the Jamuna and went to capital Dhaka, where he attended the University of Dhaka to receive an MA degree in Bengali literature and language in 1989 with a First Class. He was awarded a research grant by the Nazrul Institute in 1996, the result of which was Nazrul: Spokesman of the Third World (Nazrul: Tritiya Bishwer Mukhopatro; 1997) published from the same institute. He also awarded a research fellow by the University Grand commission, the result of which was Travelodge of Tagore (Rabindranather Vraman Sahitya 2010).

=== Career ===
Mahmud works as a journalist. He also taught Bengali literature at several colleges and universities for five years.

=== Activism ===
Mahmud has been working with poor and vulnerable people in Bangladesh, especially destitute northern part of the country from two decades. He established Organization for Social Advancement & Cultural Activities (OSACA) a non-government organisation which is fighting for hunger and legal rights.

== Publications ==
=== Poetry ===
- Boutubani Fuler Deshe (In the World of the Boutubanis) 1985
- Mahfuja Mongol, 1989
- Goshther Dikey (Towards the Pasture), 1996
- Ball Upakhyan (Odyssey of a Ball), 2001
- Apple Kahinee (Story of an Apple), 2002
- Dhatri clinicer Janma (The birth of maternity Clinic), 2007
- Singha o Gardobher Kabita (Poems of Lion and Dunky), 2012

==== Mahfuza Mangal ====
Majid Mahmud's book of poetry is a dedication to 'Mahfuza', following the trend of poetry and songs dedicated to gods and goddesses of religions and sects of the subcontinent. The poetry dedicated to gods and goddesses was for relief from the vagaries of nature. Majid Mahmud's poetry is passionate as images continue in their contortions. The space between man and gods and goddess resonates with the enormity of infinity and eternity. This collection is the edition published on the twenty-fifth anniversary of the first publication of the book in February 1989. After that there have been three more editions.

=== Novel ===
Mahmud’s debut novel, Memorial Club, was first published in Bangla in 2021 and was a fixture at the Amar Ekushey Book Fair that same year. It was eventually translated to English and published by Gaudy Boy in 2025 as his first foray into the international market.

=== Essays, researches and narrative prose ===
- Nazrul: Tritiya Bishwer Mukhopatro (Nazrul: Spokesman of the Third World), 1997
- Rabindranather Vraman Sahitya (Travelodge of Tagore), 2010
- Keno Kabi Keno Kabi Nay (Why Poet or Not), 2002
- Uttar Uponibesh Sahitya O Onyano (Post-Colonial Literature and Others), 2006
- Bhasar Adhipatya (Dominations of Language), 2005
- Rabindranath and Bharat Barso, 2011.

=== Short stories and fiction ===
- Makarsha o Rajanigandha (Spider and Tube-rose), 1986
- Memorial Club, 2021

=== Edited books ===
- Brikha Bhalobaser Kabita ( The Anthology of Affection to Three), 2000
- Jamrul Hasan Beg Smarak Grontha (A book on Jamrul Hasan Beg), 2003
- Rabindranather Bhroman Sahitya (Travelogues of Tagore) 2010
- Ashir dashoker Kabi o Kabita (Poems of Eighties), 1990

=== Journals and magazines ===
- Bangla Literature (1997), editor, a poetry journal
- Parbo, editor, a literary periodical journal (publishing 2005 to till)

== Awards ==
- Poet Binay Majumder, Literary Award, Kolkata, 2011
- National Press Club Award, 2008
- Poet Bande Ali Literary Award, 1988
- Poet Manjus Dash Literary Award, Kolkata, 2004
- Poet Mojibur Rahman, Literary Award, 2005
- Poet Mokbul Hossain Literary Award, 1999
- Arunima Literary Award, 2012
- Rabindra Nazrul Literary Award, 2006
- Bengali Community Literary Honor from Delhi, 2010
- Bengali Writers Honor from London, 2010
- Jibanananda Das Award, 2015, Kokata, India
