= Abdul Bari Sardar =

Bangladeshi politician

Member of Bangladesh Parliament
- In office 1979–1986

Personal details
- Born: 1943 Bharaimari, Pabna District, Bengal Presidency
- Died: April 8, 2021 (aged 77–78) Bharaimari, Bangladesh
- Party: Bangladesh Nationalist Party

Mohammad Abdul Bari Sardar (Bengali: আব্দুল বারী সরদার; 1943 – 8 April 2021) was a Bangladesh Nationalist Party politician and a former member of parliament for Pabna-11.

== Early life and family ==
Sardar was born in c. 1943 to a Bengali family of Muslim Sardars from the village of Bharaimari in Salimpur, Pabna District, Bengal Presidency. He was the son of Ahad Ali Sardar and father of BNP politician Shahriar Ahmad Shahid Sardar.

== Career ==
Sarkar was elected to parliament from Pabna-11 as a Bangladesh Nationalist Party candidate in 1979.
