= Sirajul Islam Sarder =

Bangladeshi politician

- সিরাজুল ইসলাম সরদার

Member of Parliament for Pabna-4
- In office March 1991 – June 1996
- Preceded by: Manjur Rahman Biswas
- Succeeded by: Shamsur Rahman Sherif

Personal details
- Born: Pabna District

Sirajul Islam Sarder is a Bangladesh Nationalist Party politician. He is a former Jatiya Sangsad member representing the Pabna-4 constituency elected in 1991 and February 1996.
