= Dabir Uddin Ahmed =

Bangladeshi politician

Member of Parliament for Pabna-4
- In office 1973–1975
- Succeeded by: Abdul Latif Mirza

Personal details
- Born: 1 November 1927 Sirajganj, Bengal Presidency, British India
- Died: 2 June 1996 (aged 68) Sirajganj, Bangladesh
- Party: Bangladesh Awami League
- Education: University of Dhaka

Dabir Uddin Ahmed (1 November 1927 – 2 June 1996) was a Bangladesh Awami League politician and a member of parliament for Pabna-4 (now Sirajganj-4). He was the organizer of the Liberation War of Bangladesh.

== Early life ==
Ahmed was born on 1 November 1927 in the village of Majhipara in what is now Ullapara Upazila of Sirajganj district. His father was Samatullah Akand. He started his legal career in Sirajganj in 1958 with a bachelor's degree in law from the University of Dhaka.

== Career ==
Ahmed was a lawyer. He was the organizer of the Liberation War of Bangladesh. He joined the Awami League in 1956. He played a role in the language movement at Dhaka University. He was elected to parliament from the then Pabna-4 (now Sirajganj-4) as a Bangladesh Awami League candidate in 1973.

== Death ==
Ahmed died on 2 June 1996.
