= Panjab Ali Biswas =

Bangladeshi politician

- পাঞ্জাব আলী বিশ্বাস

Member of Parliament for Pabna-4
- In office 1986–1988
- Preceded by: Abdul Latif Mirza
- Succeeded by: Manjur Rahman Biswas

Personal details
- Born: Pabna District
- Party: Jatiya Samajtantrik Dal-JSD
- Other political affiliations: Bangladesh Awami League

Panjab Ali Biswas is a Bangladesh Awami League politician. He was elected a member of parliament from Pabna-4 in 1986.

== Career ==
Biswas was elected a member of parliament in 1986 from Pabna-4.
