= Pabna-4 =

Constituency of Bangladesh's Jatiya Sangsad

Coordinates: 24.12°N 89.06°E

- Constituency for the Jatiya Sangsad
- District: Pabna District
- Division: Rajshahi Division
- Electorate: 362,483 (2018)

Current constituency
- Created: 1973
- Party: Bangladesh Jamaat-e-Islami
- Member: Md. Abu Taleb Mondol
- ← 70 Pabna-3 72 Pabna-5 →

Pabna-4 is a constituency represented in the Jatiya Sangsad (National Parliament) of Bangladesh since 2026 by Md. Abu Taleb Mondol of the Bangladesh Jamaat-e-Islami.

== Boundaries ==
The constituency encompasses Atgharia and Ishwardi upazilas.

== History ==
The constituency was created for the first general elections in newly independent Bangladesh, held in 1973.

== Members of Parliament ==
Election	Member	Party
1973	Dabir Uddin Ahmed	Awami League
1979	Abdul Latif Mirza	Jatiya Samajtantrik Dal
Major Boundary Changes
1986	Panjab Ali Biswas	Jatiya Samajtantrik Dal (Rab)
1988	Manjur Rahman Biswas	Jatiya Party
1991	Sirajul Islam Sarder	Bangladesh Nationalist Party
1996	Shamsur Rahman Sherif	Awami League
2020 by-election	Nuruzzaman Biswas	Awami League
2024	Galibur Rahman Sherif	Awami League
2026	Md. Abu Taleb Mondol	Bangladesh Jamaat-e-Islami

== Elections ==
=== Elections in the 2010s ===
Shamsur Rahman Sherif was re-elected unopposed in the 2014 general election after opposition parties withdrew their candidacies in a boycott of the election.

=== Elections in the 2000s ===
General Election 2008: Pabna-4
Party	Candidate	Votes	%	±%
AL	Shamsur Rahman Sherif	147,334	58.0	+19.7
BNP	Sirajul Islam Sardar	104,901	41.3	+11.8
IAB	Abdul Jalil	1,092	0.4	N/A
National People's Party	Soleman Pramanik	413	0.2	N/A
KSJL	Md. Ataul Hassan	184	0.1	N/A
Majority		42,433	16.7	+7.9
Turnout		253,924	91.6	+8.5
AL hold				

General Election 2001: Pabna-4
Party	Candidate	Votes	%	±%
AL	Shamsur Rahman Sherif	85,311	38.3	−2.1
BNP	Sirajul Islam Sarder	65,721	29.5	−4.6
Independent	Habibur Rahman Habib	63,616	28.6	N/A
IJOF	Panjab Ali Biswas	7,683	3.4	N/A
CPB	Jashim Uddin Mondal	244	0.1	N/A
Independent	Md. Jahid Akter Jamil	103	0.0	N/A
Independent	Abdus Sattar Md. Shariful Islam Raja	65	0.0	N/A
Majority		19,590	8.8	+2.4
Turnout		222,743	83.1	+0.3
AL hold				

=== Elections in the 1990s ===
General Election June 1996: Pabna-4
Party	Candidate	Votes	%	±%
AL	Shamsur Rahman Sherif	66,424	40.4	+11.9
BNP	Sirajul Islam Sarder	55,944	34.1	+0.6
Jamaat	Nasir Uddin	35,596	21.7	−4.4
JP(E)	Md. Anwar Hossain	5,022	3.1	+1.7
Zaker Party	Abdul Gaffar	797	0.5	−1.0
Gano Forum	Md. Azizol Haque	228	0.1	N/A
Independent	Habibur Rahman Habib	204	0.1	N/A
Majority		10,480	6.4	+1.5
Turnout		164,215	82.8	+14.0
AL gain from BNP				

General Election 1991: Pabna-4
Party	Candidate	Votes	%	±%
BNP	Sirajul Islam Sarder	48,058	33.5	
AL	Md. Habibur Rahman	40,970	28.5	
Jamaat	Nasir Uddin	37,562	26.1	
Jatiya Samajtantrik Dal-JSD	Panjab Ali Biswas	12,322	8.6	
Zaker Party	Md. A. Gaffar	2,169	1.5	
JP(E)	Manjur Rahman Biswas	1,979	1.4	
Independent	Md. Jamal Uddin	205	0.1	
JSD	Lutfor Rahman Kham	203	0.1	
CPB	Md. Jasim Uddin Mondol	102	0.1	
NAP (Muzaffar)	Abul Kashem Bishwas	73	0.1	
Majority		7,088	4.9	
Turnout		143,643	68.8	
BNP gain from JP(E)				
