= Lalon Shah Bridge =

Bridge in Bangladesh

Lalon Shah Bridge লালন শাহ সেতু
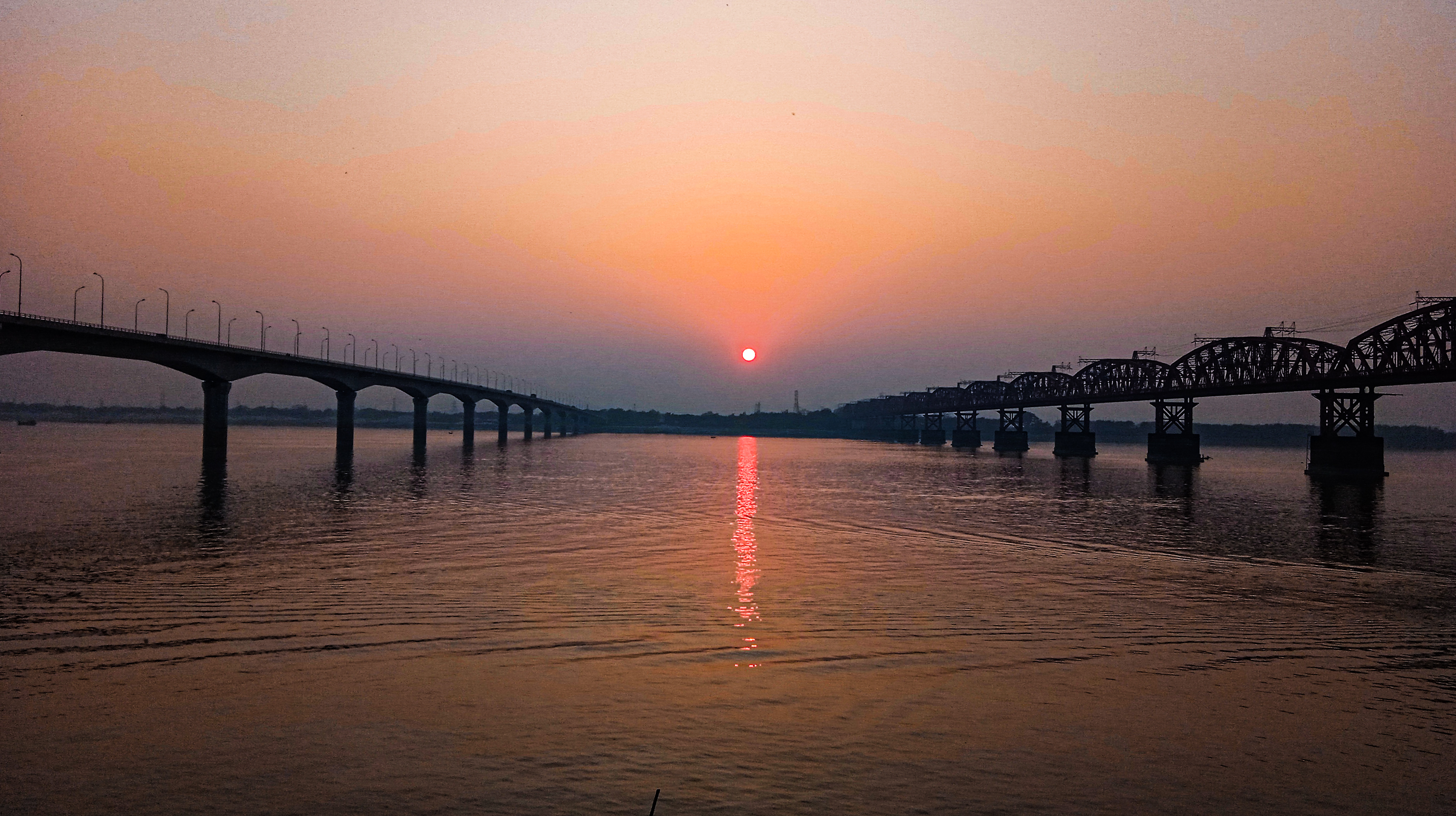
- Lalon Shah Bridge over the Padma River
- Coordinates: 24.0654°N 89.0300°E
- Carries: N704 highway
- Crosses: Padma River
- Locale: Ishwardi Upazila, Pabna District and Bheramara Upazila, Kushtia District

Characteristics
- Design: Box girder bridge
- Material: Prestressed concrete
- Total length: 1.8 km
- Width: 18.10 m

History
- Constructed by: China Major Bridge Engineering Co. Ltd.
- Opened: 18 May 2004

Location
- Interactive map of Lalon Shah Bridge

The Lalon Shah Bridge (Bengali: লালন শাহ সেতু), also known as the Pakshey Bridge, is a major road bridge in western Bangladesh. It spans the Padma River, connecting Ishwardi Upazila in Pabna District with Bheramara Upazila in Kushtia District. Opened in 2004, it is the third longest road bridge in the country and plays a vital role in linking the northwestern and southwestern regions of Bangladesh. The bridge is named after the iconic mystic poet Lalon Shah, symbolizing the cultural heritage of the region.

== Historical background ==
The need for a road bridge parallel to the historic Hardinge Bridge became increasingly urgent in the late 20th century due to rising traffic and economic demands. The foundation stone was laid in January 2001, and the bridge was completed in just over three years. It was officially inaugurated on 18 May 2004.

== Design and construction ==
The bridge was constructed by China Major Bridge Engineering Co. Ltd. using a prestressed concrete box girder design. It is 1.8 kilometers long and 18.10 meters wide, with 17 spans, each measuring approximately 109.5 meters. The structure includes a central divider separating two lanes and features modern safety and drainage systems. The project was funded by the Government of Bangladesh with support from international development partners.

== Strategic and economic importance ==
The Lalon Shah Bridge carries the N704 highway, providing a crucial road link between the northern districts and the southern port of Mongla. It facilitates the movement of goods and people across the Padma River and is especially important for transporting materials to the Rooppur Nuclear Power Plant. The bridge has significantly reduced travel time and boosted trade and commerce in the region.

== Cultural significance ==
Naming the bridge after Lalon Shah, a revered Baul saint and philosopher, reflects the deep cultural roots of the region. Lalon's philosophy of spiritual humanism and social equality resonates with the bridge's symbolic role in connecting diverse communities. The bridge is often illuminated during festivals and has become a local landmark and tourist attraction.

== Tourism and scenic value ==
The bridge offers panoramic views of the Padma River and the adjacent Hardinge Bridge. Its scenic surroundings, especially during sunset or moonlit nights, attract visitors and photographers. The area has become a popular spot for locals and tourists alike, contributing to the region's tourism economy.

== Transportation and connectivity ==
The bridge connects key districts such as Kushtia, Meherpur, Chuadanga, and Jhenaidah with Pabna and Rajshahi. It plays a vital role in the national highway network and supports both passenger and freight transport. The bridge is also part of the regional connectivity plan linking Bangladesh with neighboring countries under the South Asian Subregional Economic Cooperation (SASEC) framework.

== Gallery ==
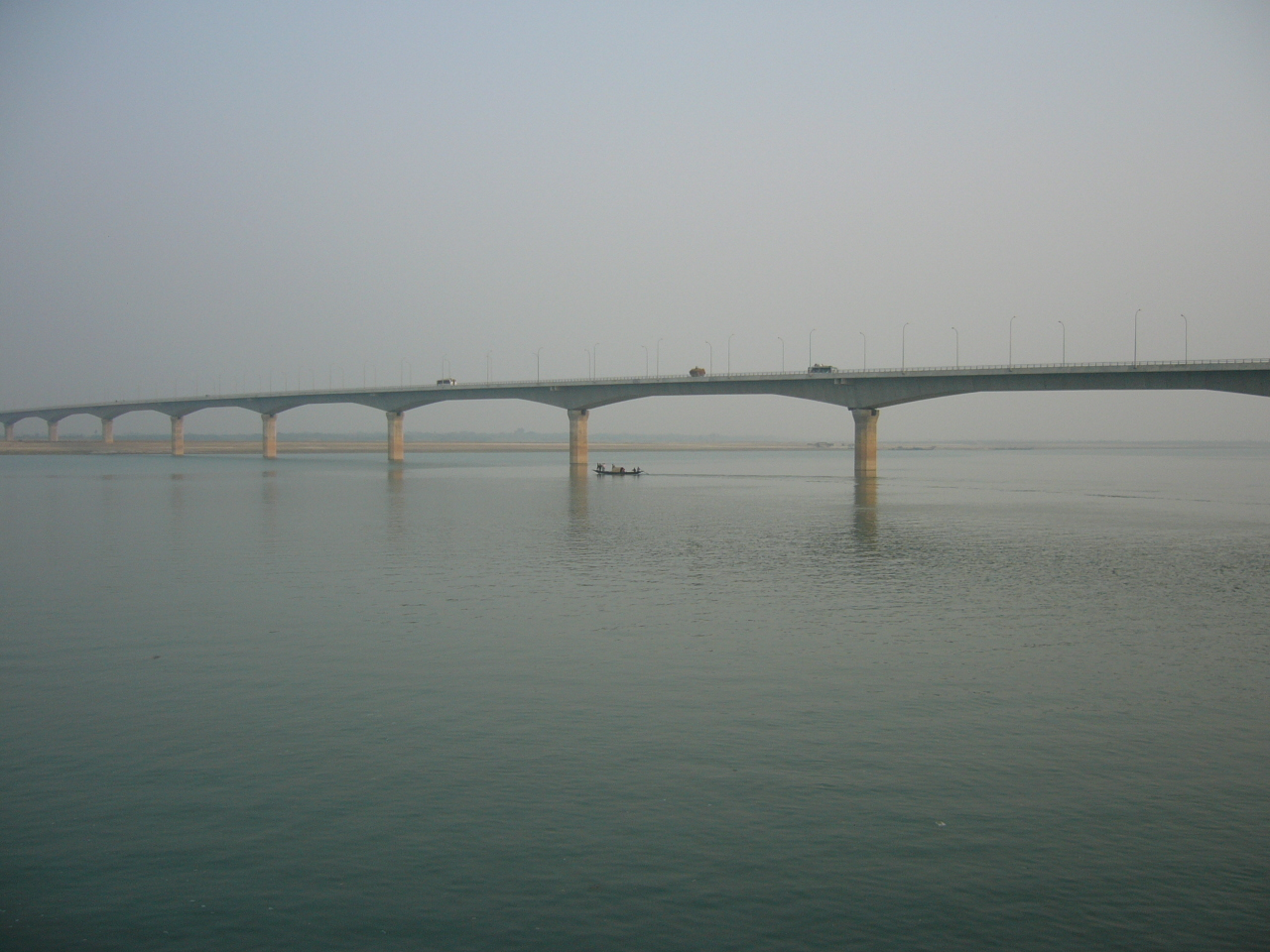
Lalon Shah Bridge over the Padma River

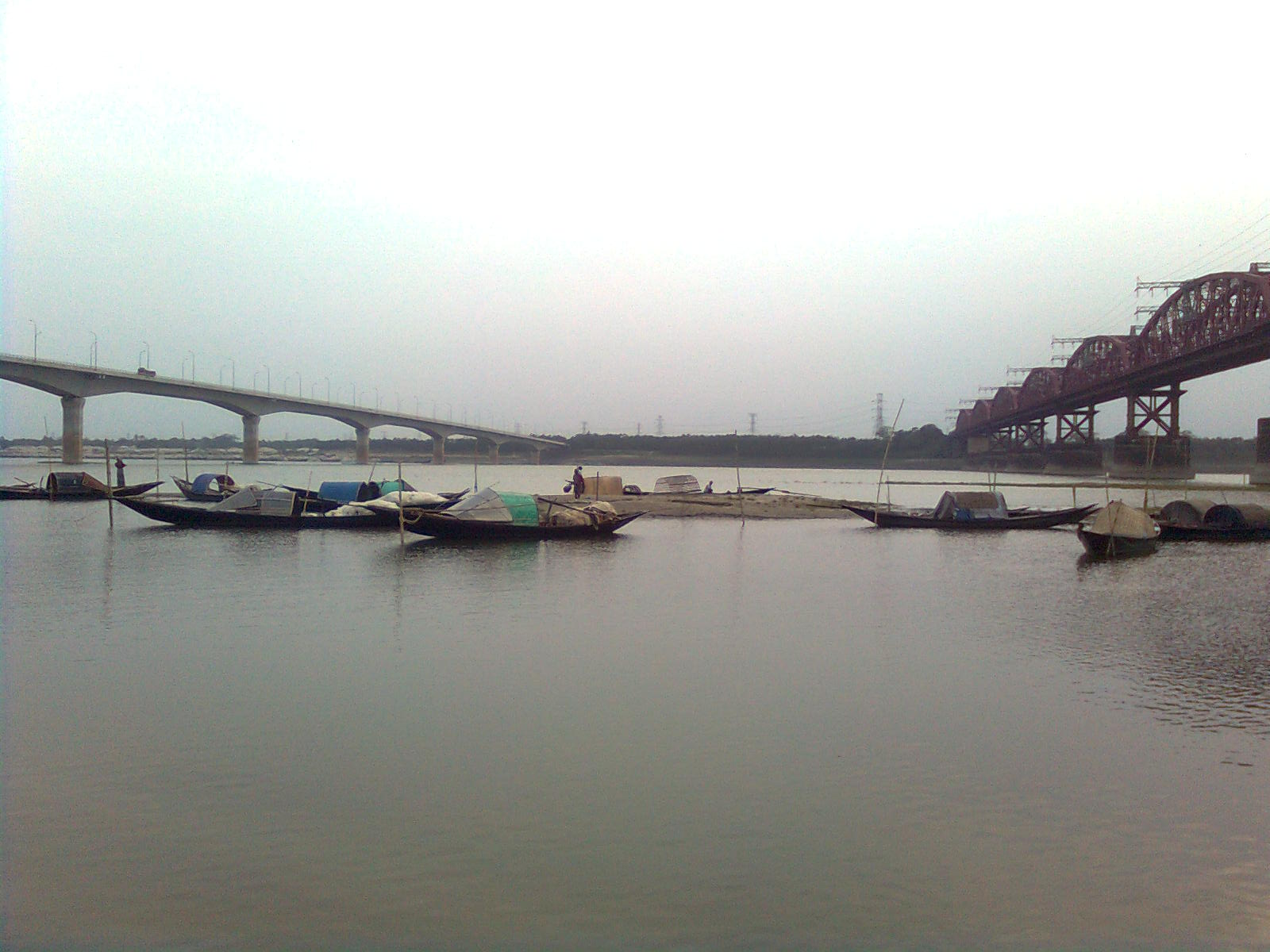
Lalon Shah and Hardinge bridges side by side

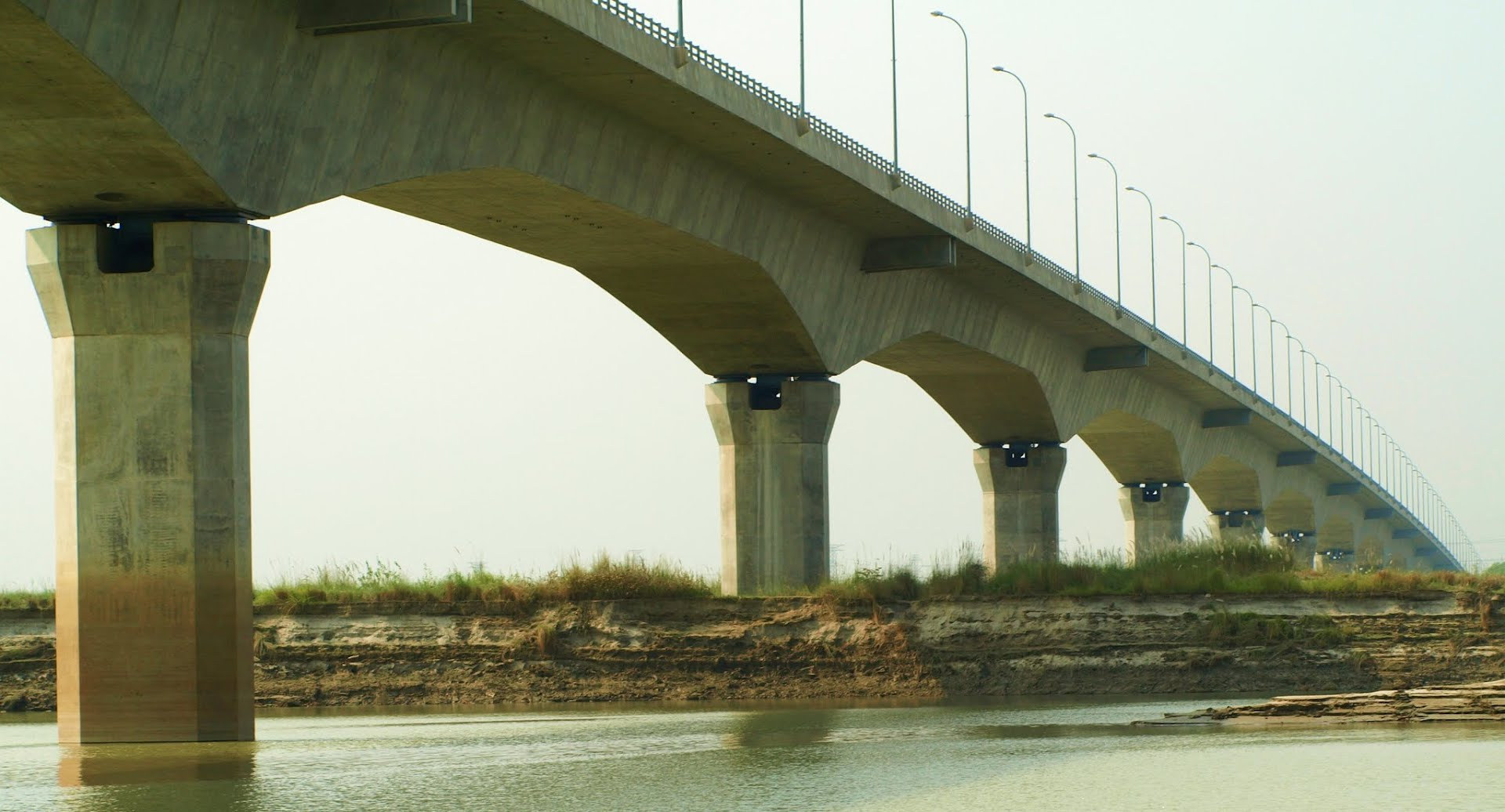
View from the riverbank

== See also ==
- Hardinge Bridge
- Padma Bridge
- Rooppur Nuclear Power Plant
- Transport in Bangladesh
- Lalon Shah
