= Manjur Rahman Biswas =

Bangladeshi politician (1950–2023)

- মঞ্জুর রহমান বিশ্বাস

Member of Parliament for Pabna-4
- In office 1988–1990
- Preceded by: Panjab Ali Biswas
- Succeeded by: Sirajul Islam Sarder

Personal details
- Born: 15 April 1950 Ishwardi, Pabna District, East Bengal, Dominion of Pakistan
- Died: 20 July 2023 (aged 73) Dhaka, Bangladesh
- Party: Jatiya Party (Ershad)

Manjur Rahman Biswas (15 April 1950 – 20 July 2023) was a Bangladesh Jatiya Party politician. He was elected a member of parliament for Pabna-4 in 1988.

== Early life and career ==
Manjur Rahman Biswas was born 15 April 1950 in Pabna District. He was elected a member of parliament in 1988 from Pabna-4.

== Death ==
Biswas died on 20 July 2023, at the age of 73.
