= Hardinge Bridge =

Railway bridge in Bangladesh

Hardinge Bridge হার্ডিঞ্জ সেতু
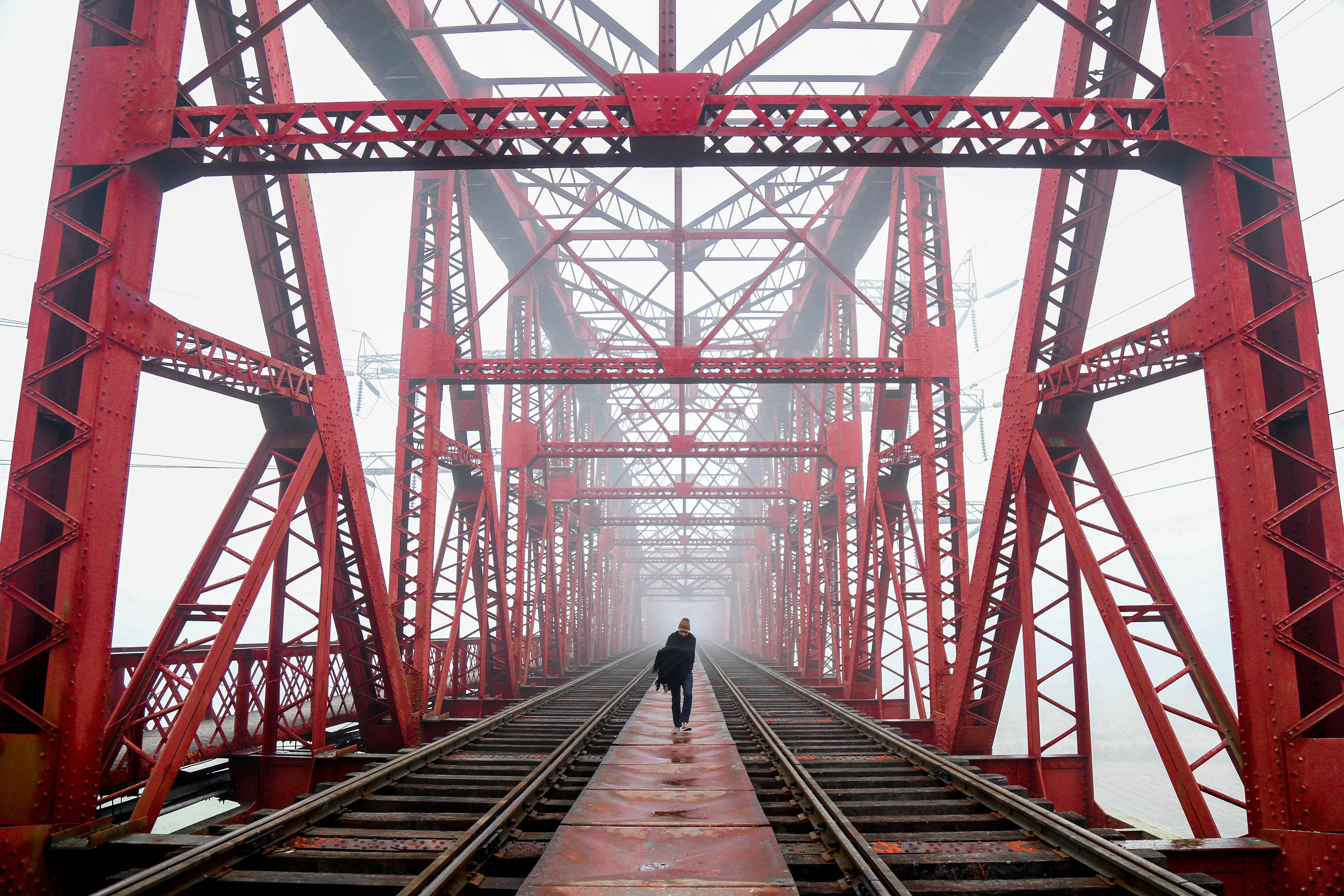
- Hardinge Bridge
- Coordinates: 24°04′04″N 89°01′45″E
- Carries: Chilahati–Parbatipur–Santahar–Darshana line
- Crosses: Padma River
- Locale: Pabna District & Kushtia District, Bangladesh
- Next downstream: Lalon Shah Bridge

Characteristics
- Design: Truss bridge
- Total length: 1,798.32 m (5,900 ft)

History
- Designer: A M Rendel
- Constructed by: Braithwaite and Kirk
- Opened: 4 March 1915

Location
- Interactive map of Hardinge Bridge

Hardinge Bridge is a steel railway truss bridge over the Padma River located at Ishwardi, Pabna and Bheramara, Kushtia in Bangladesh. It is named after Lord Hardinge, who was the Viceroy of India from 1910 to 1916. The bridge is 1.8 km (1.1 mi) long.

== Construction ==
Construction of the through truss bridge began in 1910, though it was proposed at least 20 years earlier. It was constructed by Braithwaite and Kirk Company, West Bromwich, England, based on design of Sir Alexander Meadows Rendel. It was completed in 1912, and trains started moving on it in 1915. Lord Hardinge officially opened the bridge on 4 March of that year.

== Brief history ==
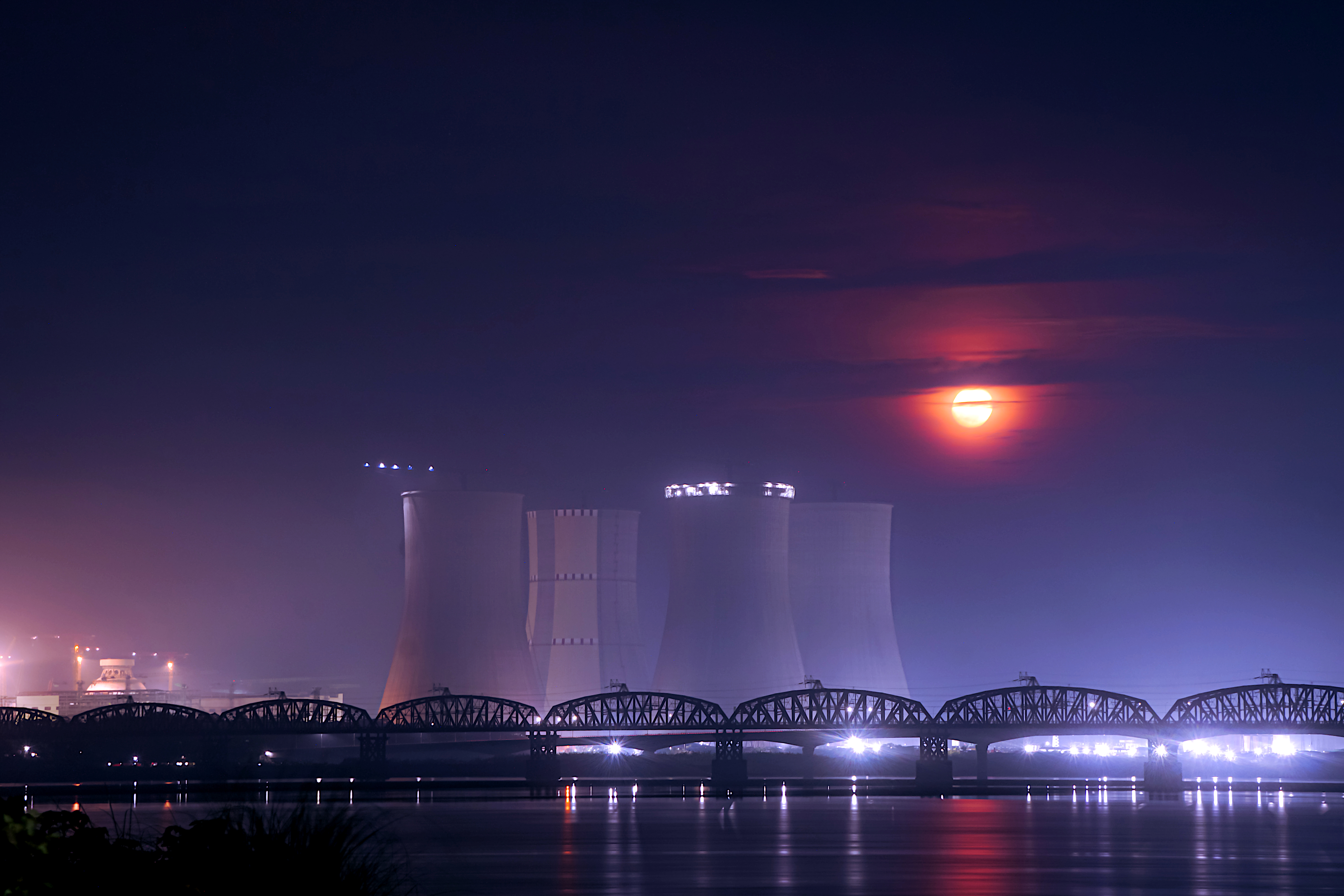
Rooppur Nuclear Power Plant, Hardinge Bridge, and Lalon Shah Bridge in the same frame on a moonlit night

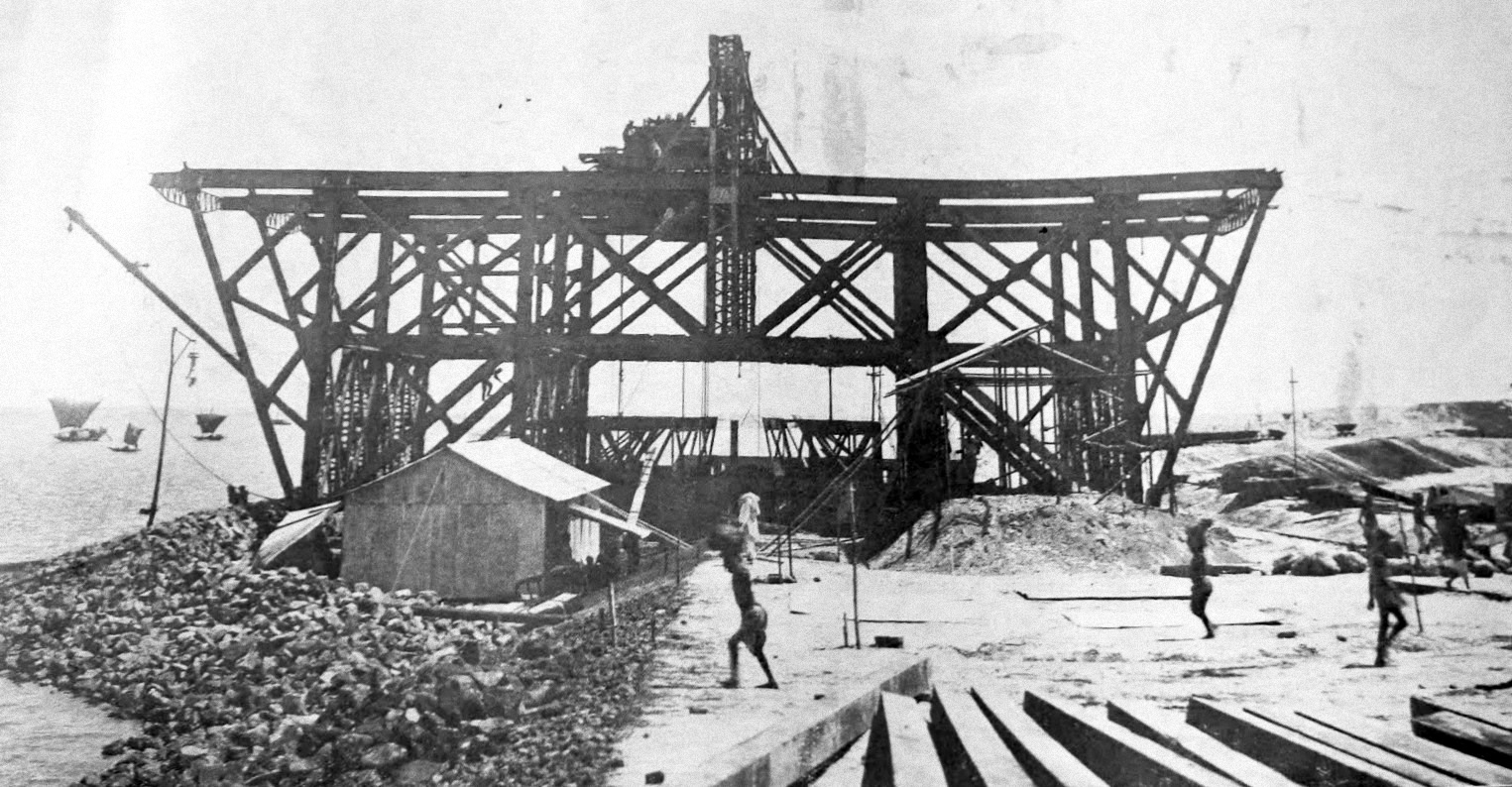
Hardinge Bridge construction (1910)

The construction of a railway bridge over the Padma was proposed in 1889 by the Eastern Bengal Railway for easier communication between Calcutta and the then Eastern Bengal and Assam. In 1902, Sir FJE Spring prepared a report on the bridge. A technical committee reported that a bridge could be constructed at Sara crossing the lower Ganges between the Paksey and Bheramara Upazila stations on the broad gauge railway from Khulna to Parbatipur Upazila. The construction of the bridge started in 1910 and finished two years later. The bridge comprises 15 steel trusses. The main girders are modified "Petit" type.

The most difficult task of the operation was to prevent bank erosion and to make the river flow permanently under the bridge. For this, two guide banks of the "Bell-bund" type, named after J. R. Bell were built on either side, each extending 910 metres (3,000 ft) upstream and 300 metres (1,000 ft) downstream from the bridge. The ends of the river banks were curved inward and heavily pitched with stone.

Hardinge Bridge was severely damaged during the Liberation War of Bangladesh of 1971. On 13 December 1971, the Indian Air Force bombed the 4th guarder from the Paksey side. As the Pakistani army was on retreat towards Jessore (their last stronghold), Hardinge Bridge was strategically very important. The allied force damaged the bridge. The Japanese government helped to reconstruct the bridge, which was reopened to public passage on 12 October 1972.

It is the second longest railway bridge in Bangladesh. Another bridge named Lalon Shah Bridge for road transport beside the Hardinge Bridge has recently been constructed.

== Gallery ==
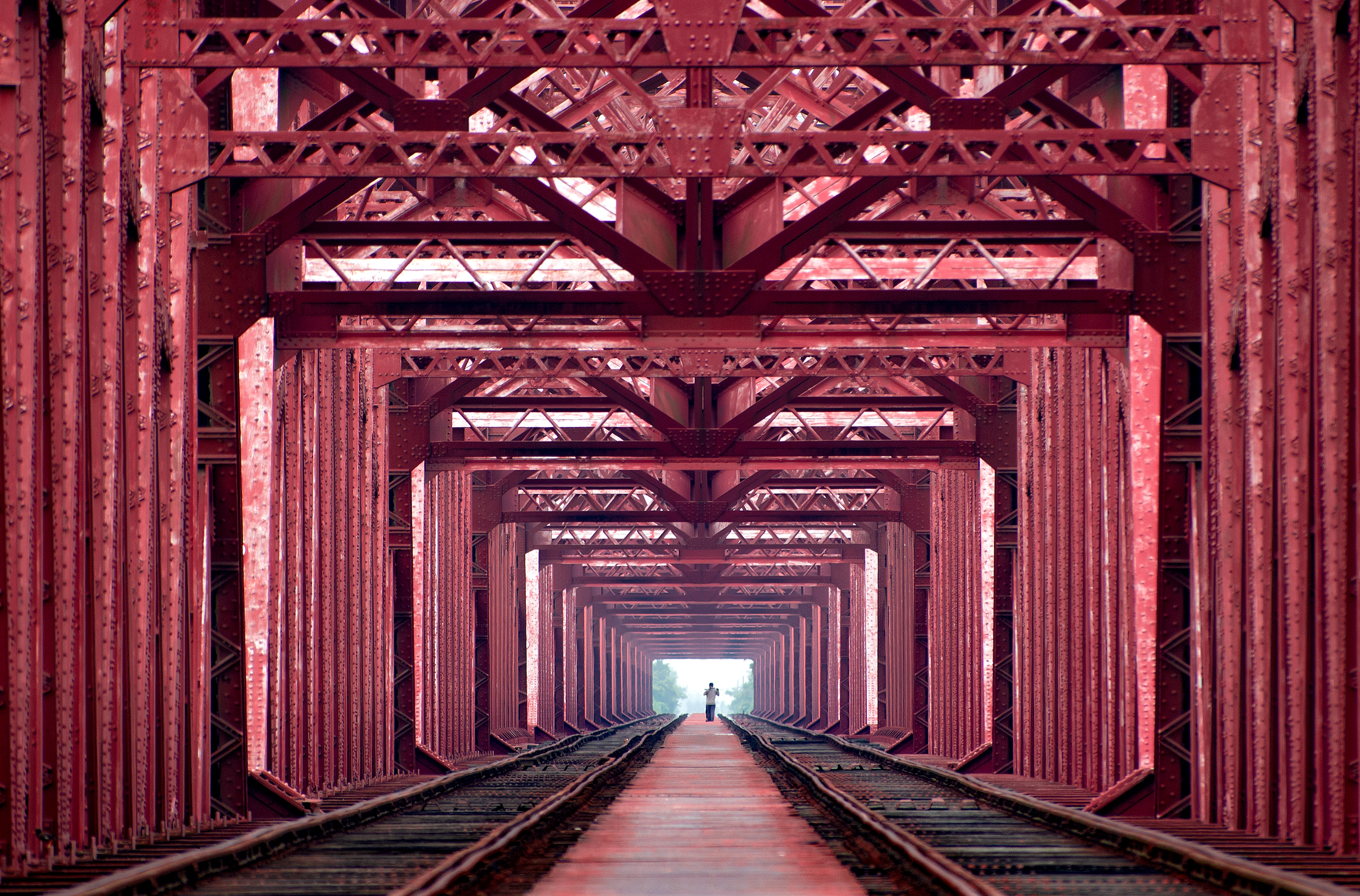

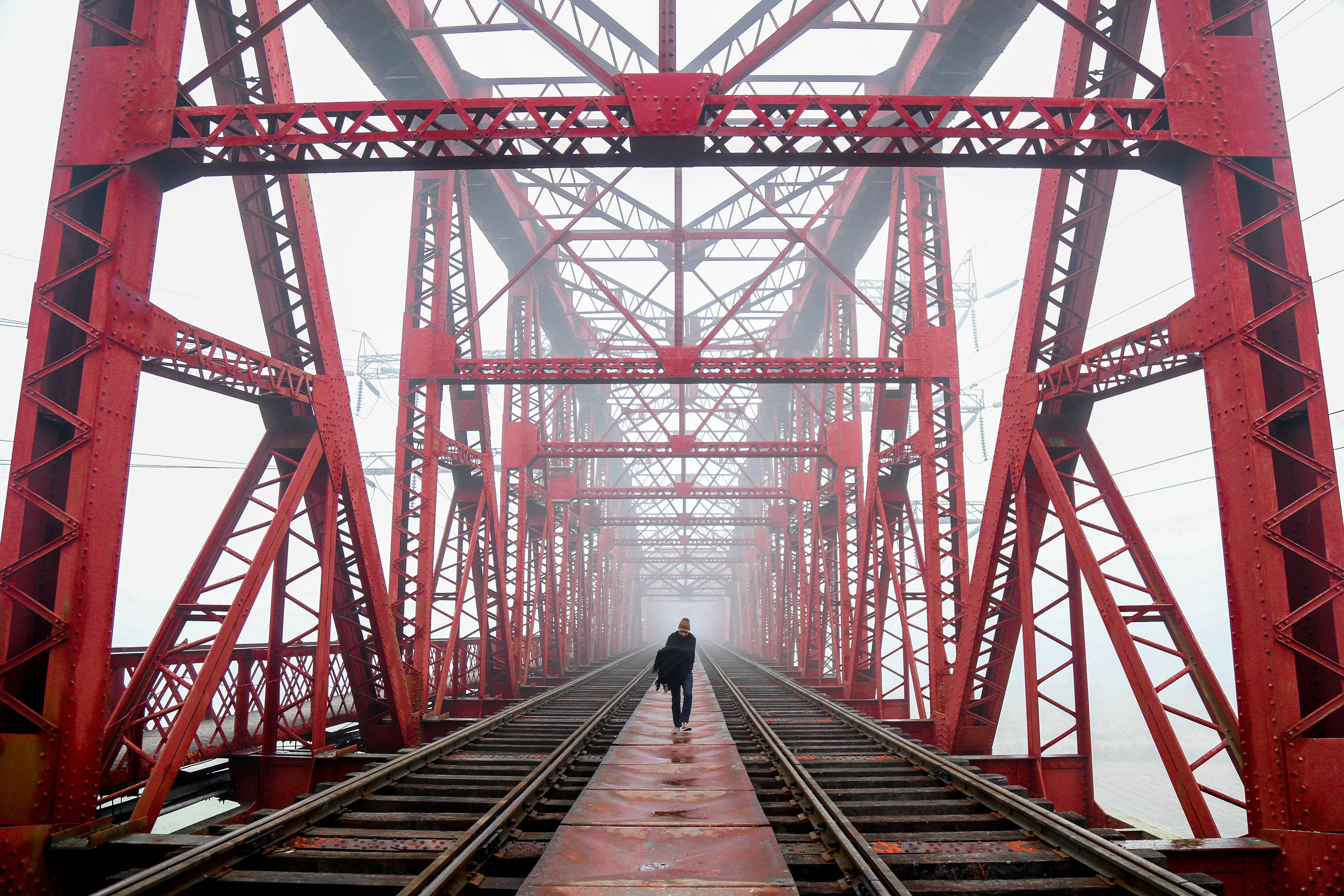

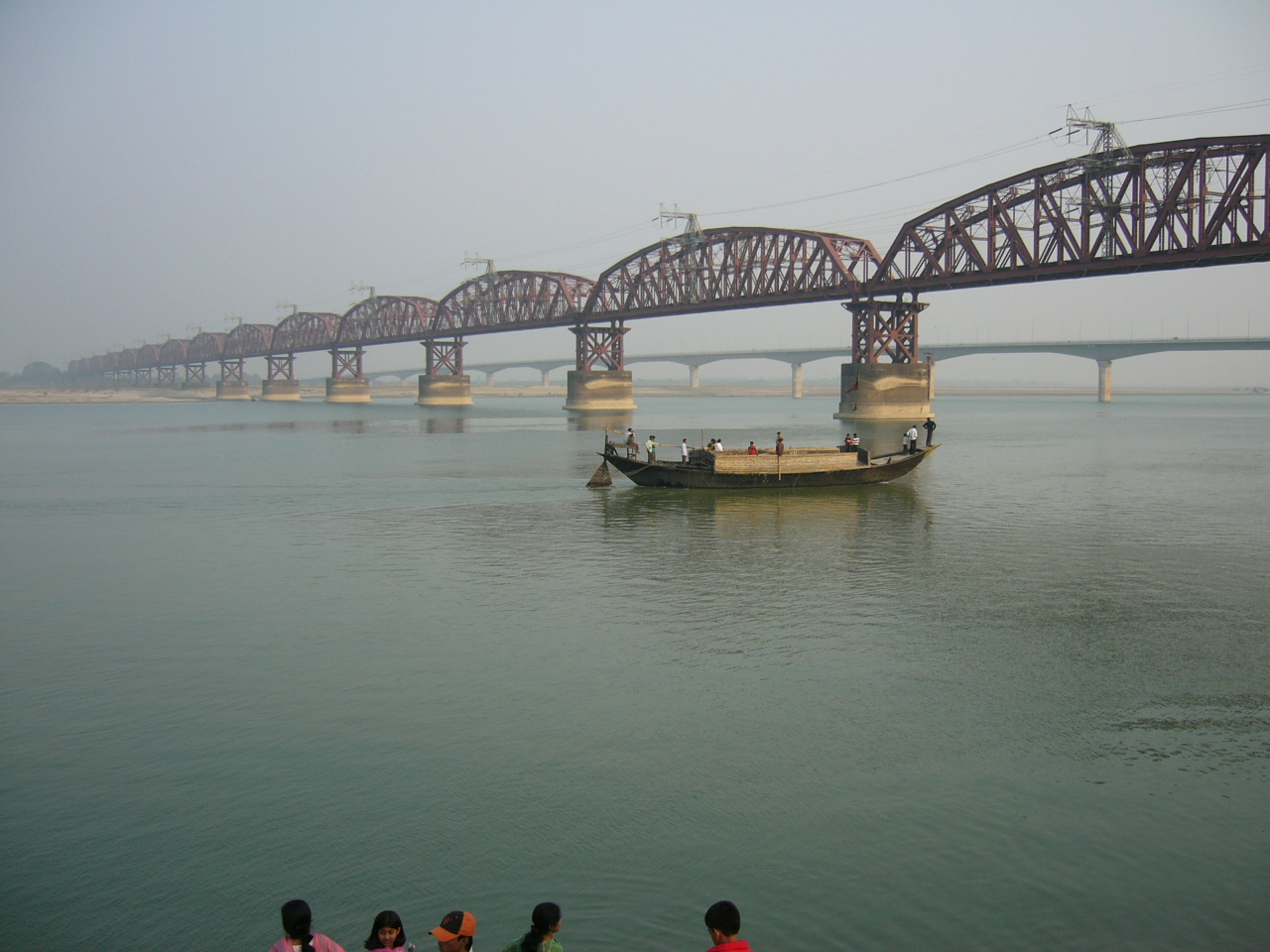

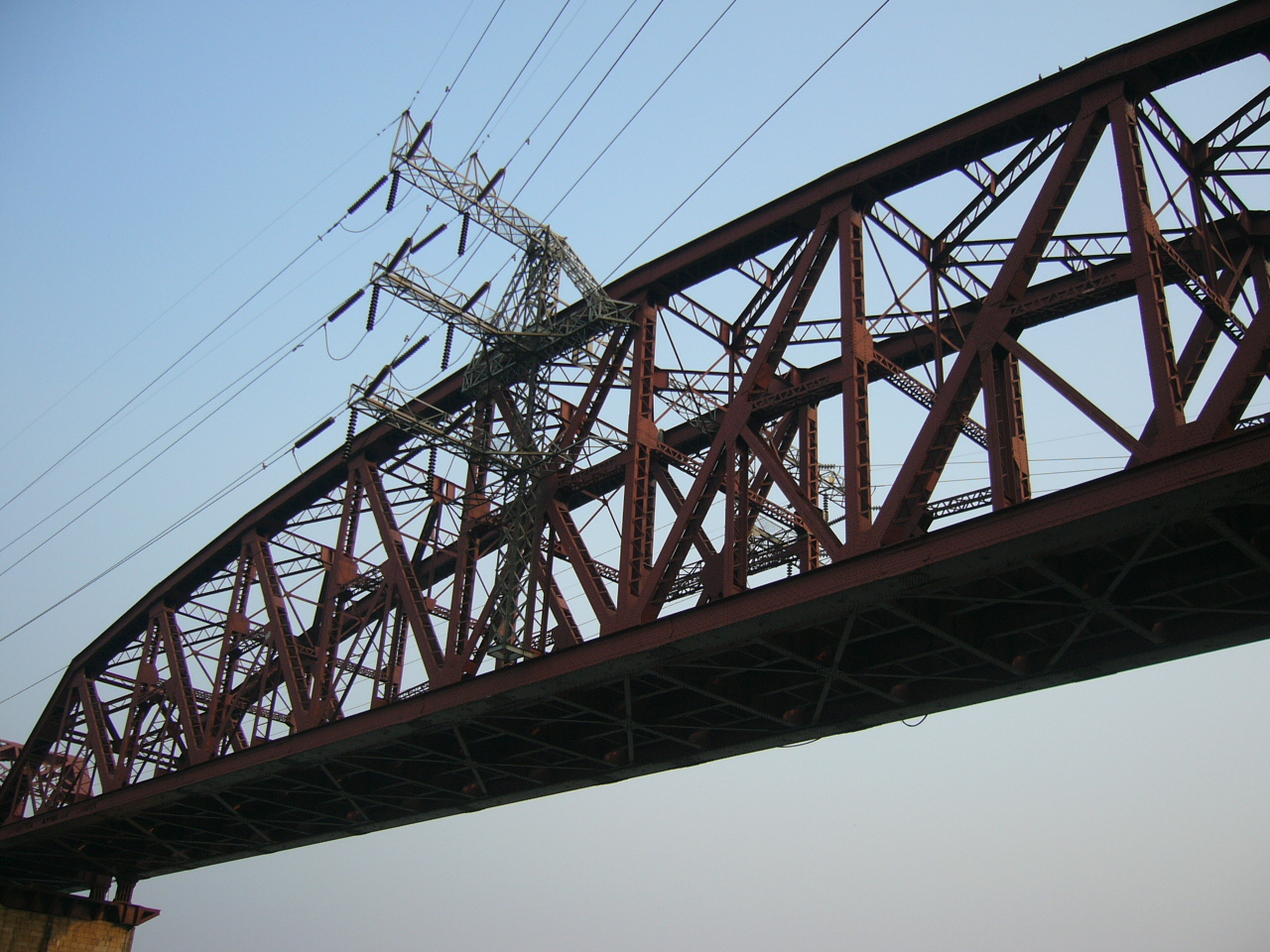

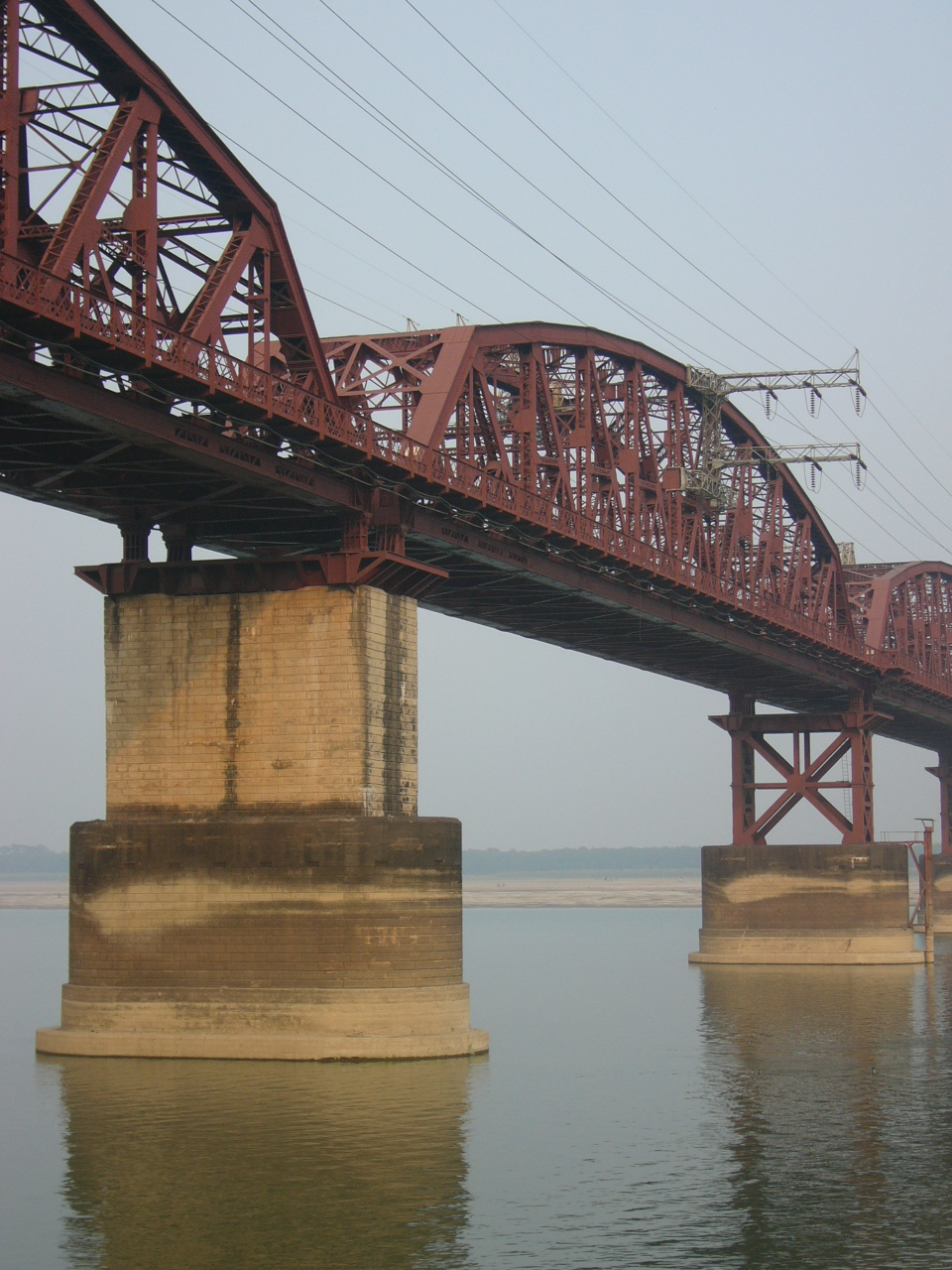

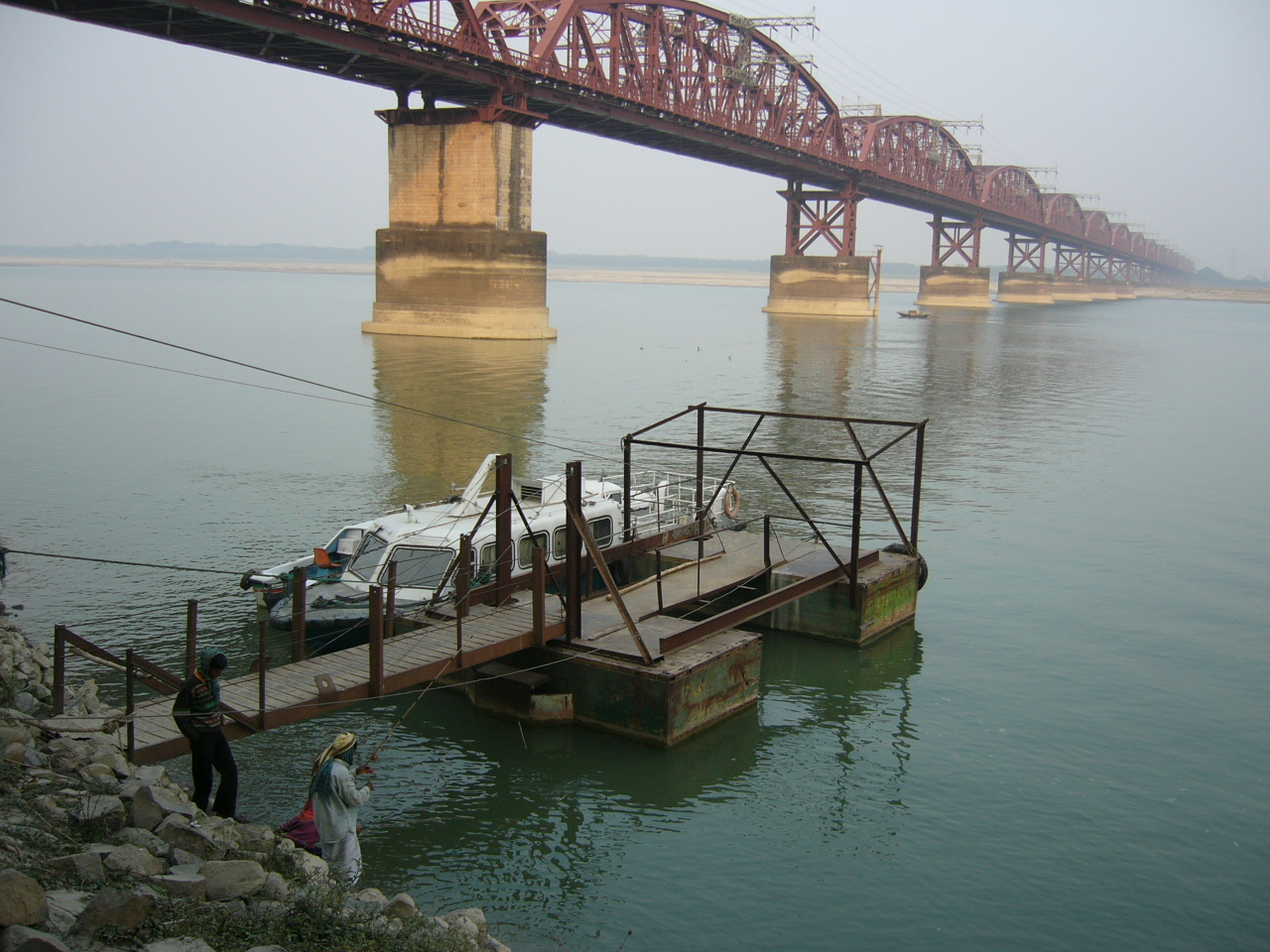

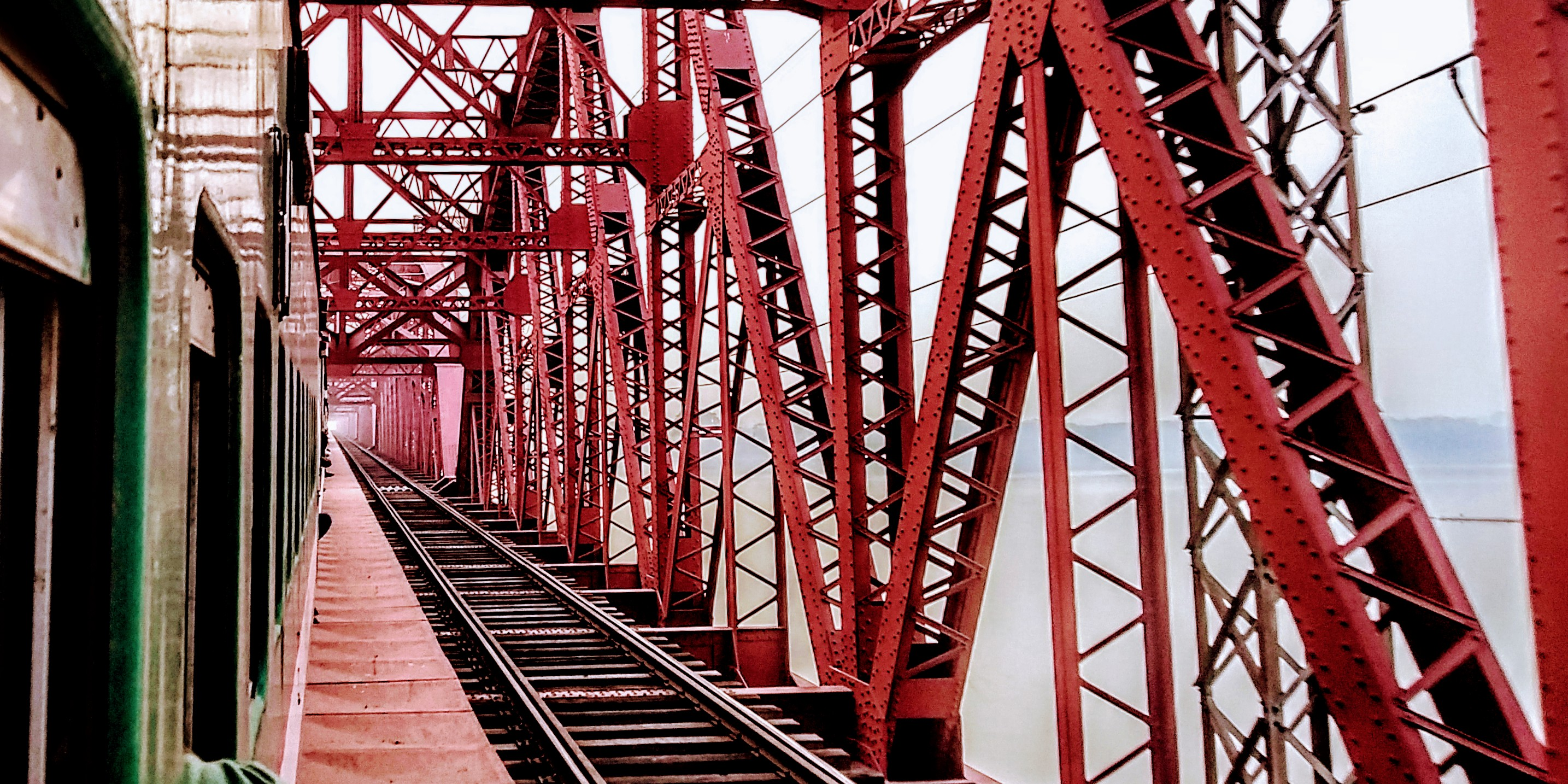

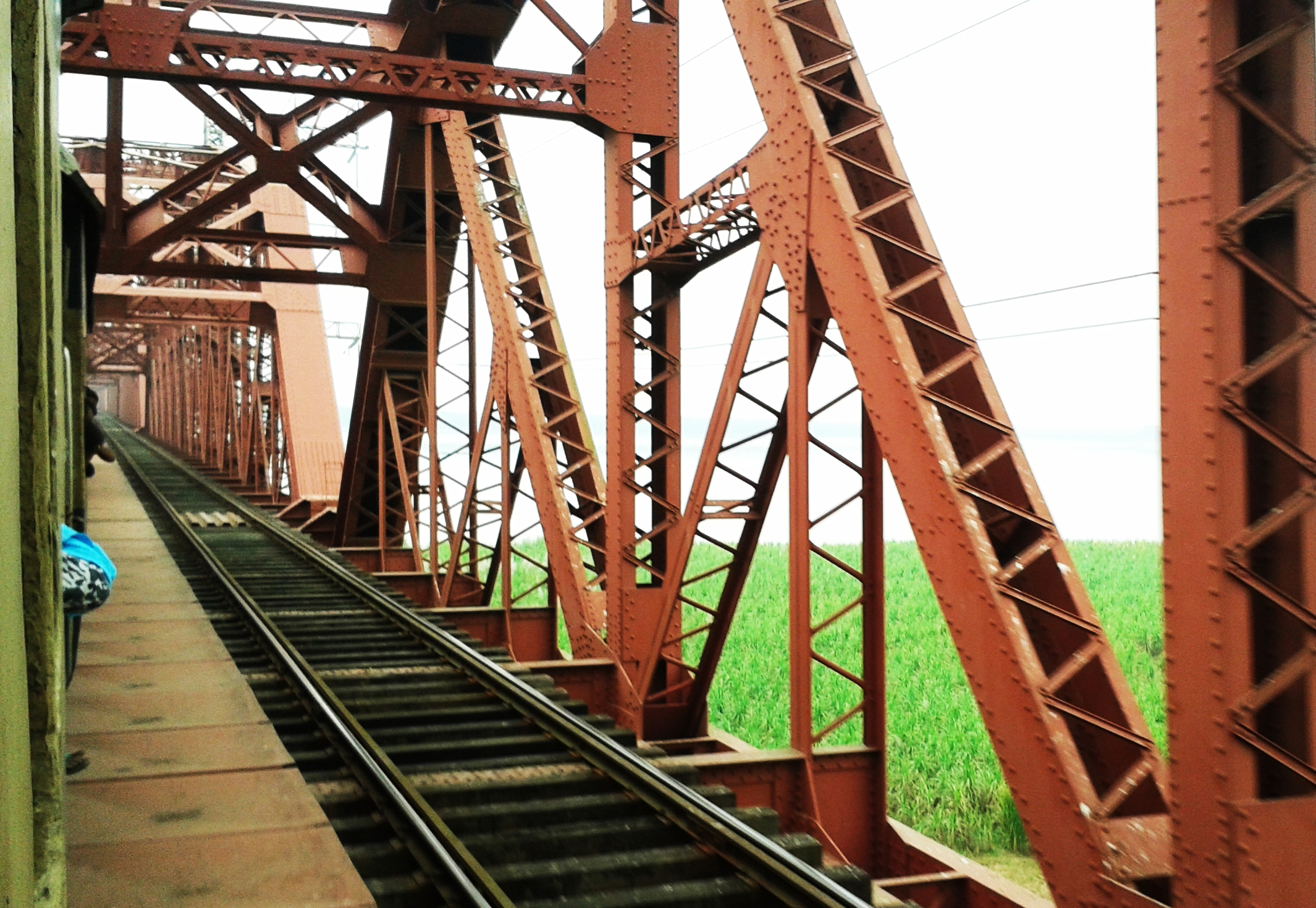

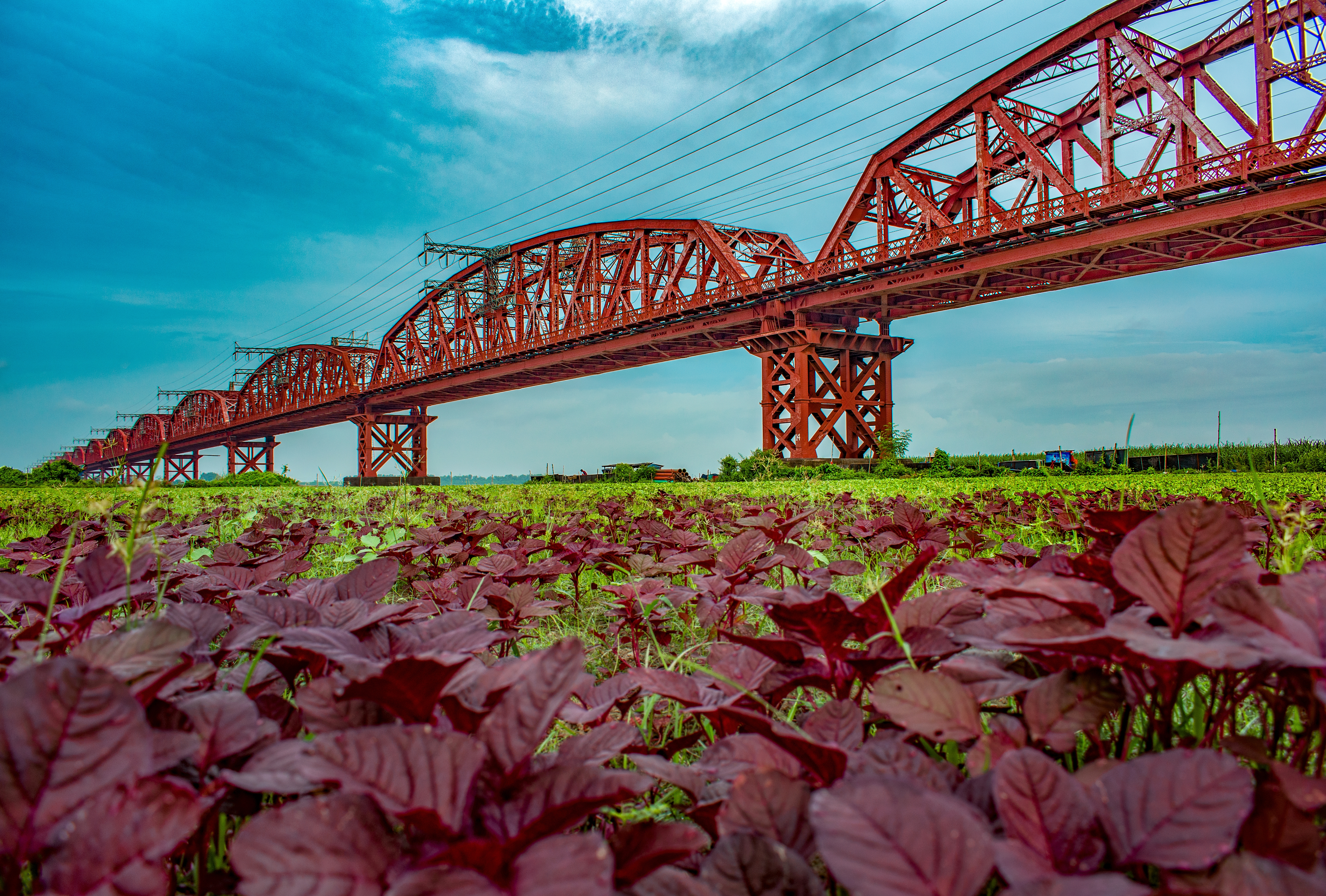
