= Nuruzzaman Biswas =

Bangladeshi politician

- নুরুজ্জামান বিশ্বাস

Member of Parliament for Pabna-4
- Incumbent
- Assumed office September 2020
- Preceded by: Shamsur Rahman Sherif

Personal details
- Party: Bangladesh Awami League

Nuruzzaman Biswas (born 30 October 1948) is a Bangladeshi politician and a Jatiya Sangsad member-elect of Pabna-4 constituency.

== Early life ==
Biswas born on 30 October 1948 to a Bengali family of Muslim Biswases in the village of Baraichara in Pabna District, East Bengal. He was the son of Khurshid Ali Biswas. He completed fifth grade from Baraichara Primary School in 1959, and then enrolled at the Sanra Marwari School in Ishwardi.

== Career ==
In 2020, Nuruzzaman Biswas elected as a member of parliament by election in Pabna-4 constituency. He wins by 2,39,924 votes of this election.

The Jatiya Sangsad seat for Pabna-4 constituency fell vacant after former Awami League MP Shamsur Rahman Sherif died on 2 April 2020, so the by-election was held on 26 September. Biswas is also the current chairman of Ishwardi Upazila and vice-president of the Pabna zila Awami League.
