= Shamsur Rahman Sherif =

Bangladeshi politician (1941–2020)

Shamsur Rahaman Sherif
- শামসুর রহমান শরীফ
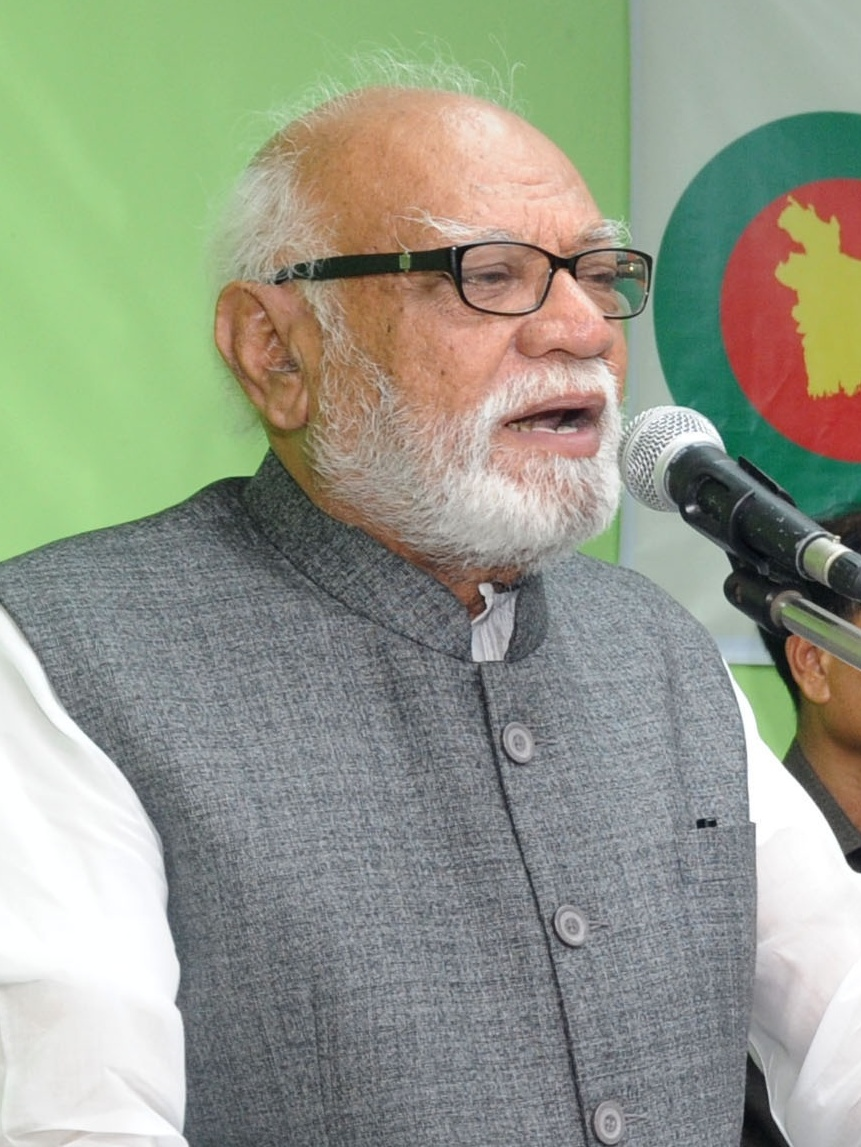
- Sherif in 2016

Minister of Land
- In office 14 January 2014 – 6 January 2019
- Prime Minister: Sheikh Hasina
- Preceded by: Rezaul Karim Hira
- Succeeded by: Saifuzzaman Chowdhury

Member of Parliament for Pabna-4
- In office 12 June 1996 – 2 April 2020
- Preceded by: Sirajul Islam Sarder
- Succeeded by: Nuruzzaman Biswas

Personal details
- Born: 12 March 1941 Pabna, Bengal Presidency, British India
- Died: 2 April 2020 (aged 79) Dhaka, Bangladesh
- Party: Bangladesh Awami League

Shamsur Rahman Sherif (12 March 1941 – 2 April 2020) was a Bangladesh Awami League politician who served as minister of land. He was a 5-term Jatiya Sangsad member representing the Pabna-4 constituency.

== Early life ==
Sherif was born on 12 March 1941 in his maternal grandfather's home at Char Shanirdiyarh in Hemayetpur Union, Pabna District, Bengal Presidency. He was the son of Lutfur Rahman, a native of the Lakshmikunda village in Ishwardi subdivision of Pabna district.

He studied at the Lakshmikunda Free Primary School and Pakuria Model English School, before enrolling at the Pabna Zilla School, where he passed his Matriculation in 1957. After that, he joined the Govt. Edward College, Pabna where he passed his Intermediate of Arts in 1960 and graduated with a Bachelor of Science in 1962.

== Career ==
Sherif was elected to parliament in the general election of June 1996 as a candidate of the Awami League from Pabna-4. He received 66,424 votes while his closest rival, Sirajul Islam Sarder of Bangladesh Nationalist Party, received 55,944 votes.

Sherif was re-elected in the general election in 2001 as a candidate of Awami League from Pabna-4. He received 85,311 votes while his nearest rival, Sirajul Islam Sarder of Bangladesh Nationalist Party, received 65,721 votes.

Sherif was re-elected in the general election of 2008 as a candidate of Awami League from Pabna-4. He received 147,334 votes while his nearest rival, Sirajul Islam Sarder of Bangladesh Nationalist Party, received 104,901 votes.

Sherif was re-elected unopposed in the 2014 general election from Pabna-4 after opposition parties withdrew their candidacies in a boycott of the election. He was a member of the Pabna District Awami League and was appointed minister of land.

Sherif's son, Shirhan Sharif Tomal, was arrested for attacking journalists in Pabna in December 2017. He was the president of Ishwardi upazila Jubo League but was expelled after the incident. He also has a case against him for attacking and robbing the home of a "freedom fighter" (veteran of Bangladesh Liberation war).

In April 2018, Sherif's personal officer, Kutubuddin Ahmed, was arrested for grabbing a land near Gulshan-Baridhara by the Anti-Corruption Commission.

Sherif was re-elected in the 2018 Bangladeshi general election as a candidate of Awami League from Pabna-4. He received 249,558 votes while his nearest rival, Md Habibur Rahman of Bangladesh Nationalist Party, 48,822. He lost his minister of land position in the newly formed cabinet.

== Death ==
Sherif died on 2 April 2020. After his death, his constituency Pabna-4 became vacant and Nuruzzaman Biswas was elected in a by-election.
