= Pratim Biswas =

American academic

- Education: IIT Bombay; California Institute of Technology
- Occupations: Asst. Vice Chancellor for International Programs, and Chair of the Department of Energy, Environmental and Chemical Engineering Director of MAGEEP
- Known for: Aerosol science and engineering

Pratim Biswas is currently the Stevenson Endowed Chair Professor of Engineering at Vanderbilt University. He is also the executive director for the Institute for Engineering Innovation to be set up at West Palm Beach, FL. Prior to this, he was the dean of Engineering of University of Miami, from January 2021. He was the Lucy and Stanley Lopata Professor of Environmental Engineering Science, asst. vice chancellor for International Programs, and chair of the Department of Energy, Environmental and Chemical Engineering at the McKelvey School of Engineering at Washington University in St. Louis. He was also director of MAGEEP, the McDonnell Academy Global Energy and Environmental Partnership. He received his doctoral degree from the California Institute of Technology in 1985, and his bachelor's degree in Mechanical Engineering from IIT Bombay in 1980. He was elected to the National Academy of Engineering in 2019 "for advancing the science of aerosol dynamics and particle removal technologies."

He has graduated and advised 65 PhD students, and with them published more than 500 refereed journal articles. He has over 44,000 citations. He has an H-index score of 106 (which measures quality and quantity of scientific output) - putting him in the top 5 percent in his field for his career stage.

A key area of his work is related to Aerosol Science and Technology, wtih application of his work in Nanoparticle Technology, Air Quality and Pollution Control, and in the Energy and Environmental technology arena.

== Career ==
Biswas began his academic career on the faculty of the University of Cincinnati, where he rose through the ranks to become a full professor and director of the university's Environmental Engineering Science Division and also spent a one-year sabbatical at the National Institute of Standards and Technology. He moved to Washington University as the inaugural Stifel and Quinette Jens Professor in 2000.

At Washington University he has assembled a strong group of aerosol researchers who collectively work on a range of topics in aerosol science and engineering. These faculty work in areas of aerosol science and technology ranging from particle formation, growth, transport, measurement, control and applications. From 2006 to 2007 he was a president of the American Association for Aerosol Research. Biswas was the president of the International Aerosol Research Assembly, from 2018 to 2022.

He was the dean, College of Engineering, University of Miami; and professor in the Department of Chemical, Environmental and Materials Engineering and Atmospheric Sciences (Rosenstiel School of Marine and Atmospheric Sciences).

Currently, he is the Stevenson Endowed Professor in the Department of Chemical and Biomolecular Engineering at Vanderbilt University.

== Major awards ==
- Kenneth Whitby Award from the American Association for Aerosol Research, 1991
- Fellow, Academy of Sciences, St. Louis, 2003
- Distinguished Alumni Award, Indian Institute of Technology, Bombay, 2011
- Distinguished Faculty Award, Washington University in St. Louis, 2012
- David Sinclair Award, American Association for Aerosol Research, 2013
- International Aerosol Research Assembly (IARA) Fellow Award, 2014
- Lawrence K. Cecil Award, AIChE, Environmental Engineering Division, 2015
- White Award, International Society for Electrostatic Precipitation, 2016
- Fellow, Association for Environmental Engineering Science Professors (AEESP), 2017
- Fuchs Memorial Award, Outstanding contributions in Aerosol Science and Technology, 2018
- Simon Freese Award, ASCE
- Fellow, American Association for the Advancement of Science (AAAS), 2021
- Member, National Academy of Engineering, Elected, 2019
