= Ishwardi Upazila =

Ishwardi ঈশ্বরদী
- Upazila of Bangladesh
- Ishurdi
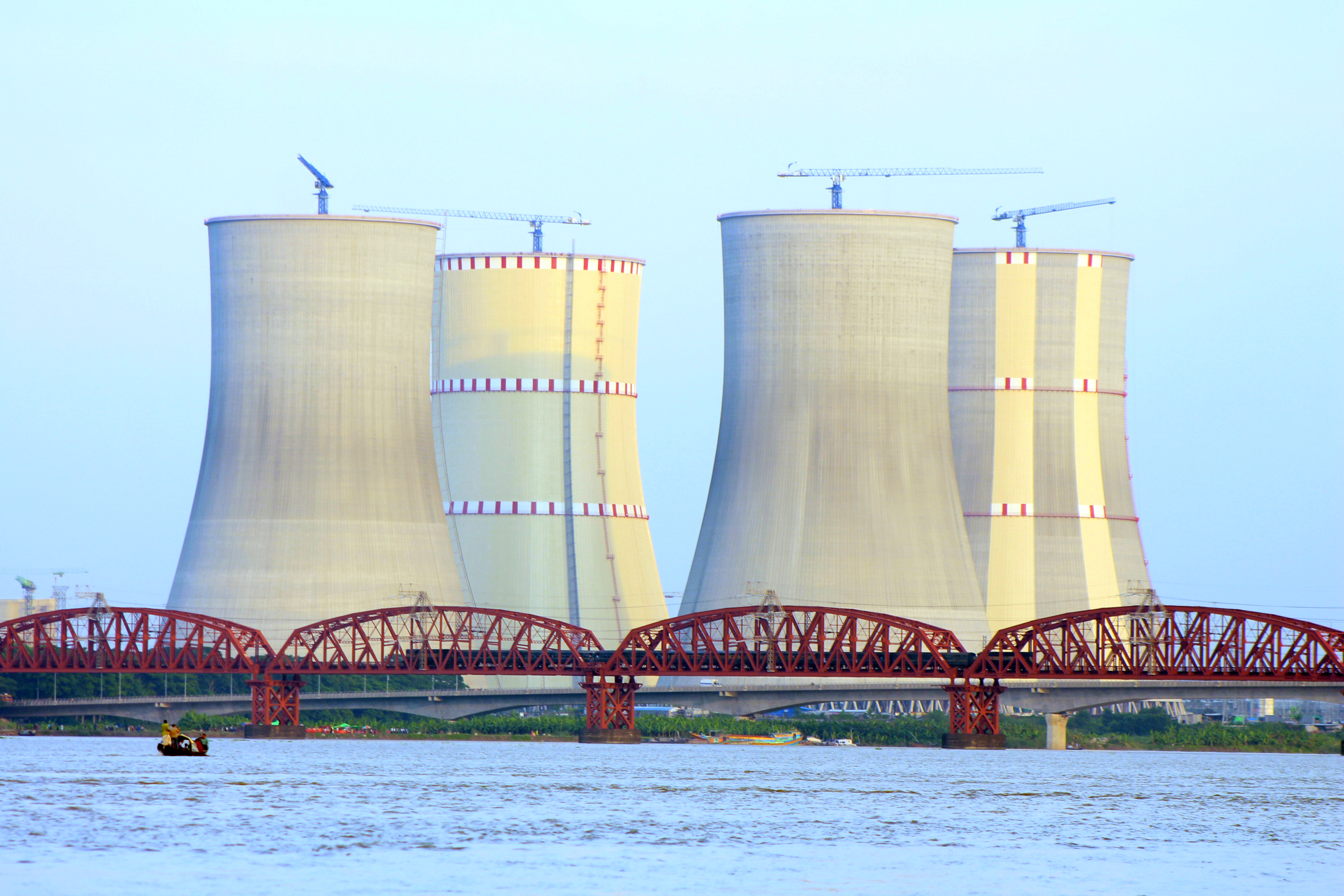
- Rooppur Nuclear Power Plant, Hardinge Bridge

- Coordinates: 24°9′N 89°4′E
- Country: Bangladesh
- Division: Rajshahi
- District: Pabna

Government
  - Type: Local government
  - Body: Upazila Parishad
  - Upazila Chairman: Md. Nayeb Ali Biswas (Bangladesh Awami League)
  - Upazila Vice Chairman: Md. Abdus Salam

Area
  - Total: 250.89 km^{2} (96.87 sq mi)
- Elevation: 12.9 m (42 ft)

Population (2022)
  - Total: 390,402
  - Density: 1,556.1/km^{2} (4,030.2/sq mi)
- Time zone: UTC+6 (BST)
- Postal code: 6620
- Area code: 07326
- Website: www.ishurdi.pabna.gov.bd

Ishwardi Upazila mauza geocode map

Ishwardi (Bengali: ঈশ্বরদী, Ish shor di) is an upazila of Pabna District in Rajshahi Division. It is the westernmost upazila of Pabna district. The River Padma and its tributaries run through it. Ruppur Nuclear Powerplant is also located in Ishwardi upazila.

== Etymology ==
While many theories have been proposed about Ishwardi's etymology, no consensus has emerged.

According to Banglapedia, the name 'Ishwardi' means God's place.

Community Report on Pabna District (2013) says:

Nothing is definitely known about the origin of the upazila name. It is learnt that in the past, Isa khan, the Mughal general with his soldiers arrived at the place where the present upazila headquarters is located. At that time there was scarcity of drinking water and Isa khan dug a big lake (meaning dighi in Bengali) for his soldiers. This lake or dighi was popularly known as Isa dighi. In course of time the area in and around the dighi became known as Ishwardi due to phonetic corruption.

— Bangladesh Bureau of Statistics, Community Report- Pabna District, Population & Housing Census, 2011, page 44

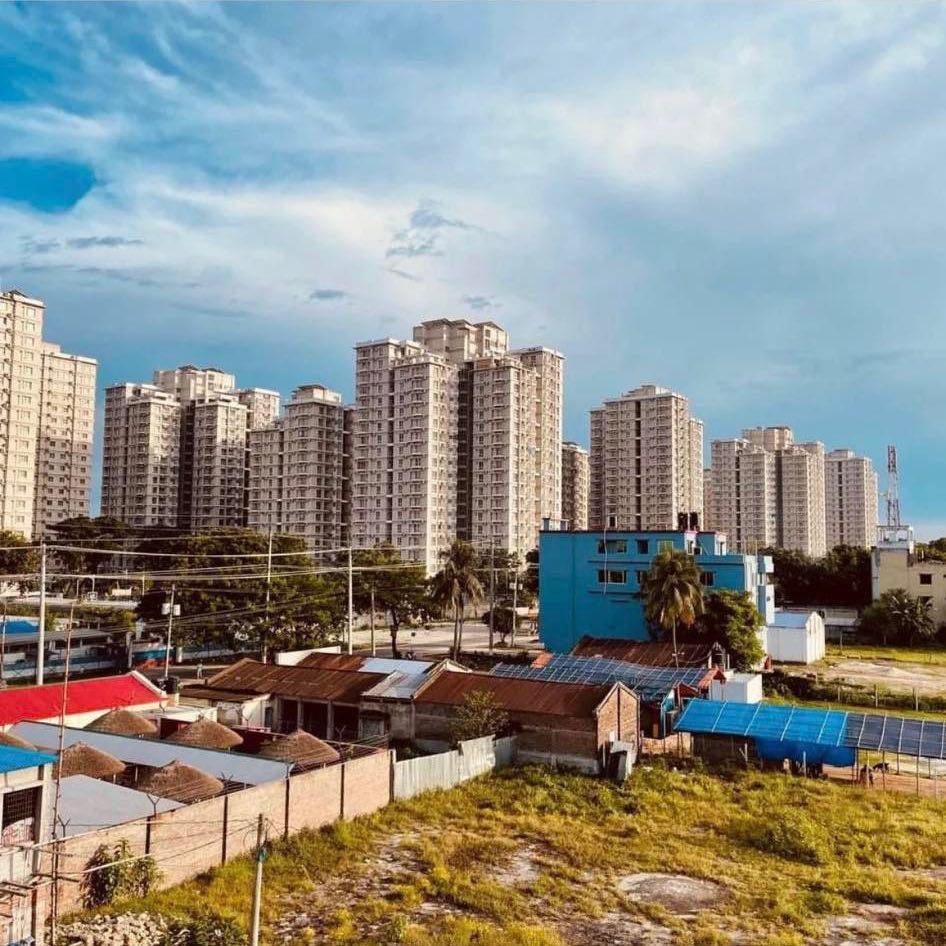
Prodigious apartment buildings in Green City, Notun Haat, Ishwardi

== Geography ==
=== Geographic location ===
The upazila occupies an area of 250.89 km^{2}. It is located between 24º03′ and 24º15′ north latitudes and between 89º00′ and 89º11′ east longitudes. The upazila is bounded on the north by Baraigram and Lalpur upazilas of Natore district, on the east by Atgharia and Pabna Sadar upazila, on the sosuth by Kumarkhali and Mirpur upazilas of Kushtia district and on the west by Bheramara upazila of Kushtia district. The river Padma flows beside Ishwardi and separates this upazila from Kushtia district.

=== Geomorphology ===
Ishwardi Upazila exhibits a diverse geomorphology. The region is characterized by a mix of plain, low-lying areas and elevated landforms. The major portion of Ishwardi Upazila lies in the vast Gangetic floodplain, featuring fertile alluvial soil deposited by the rivers. The landscape comprises riverbanks, floodplains, and locally elevated areas. The Ganges (locally known as Padma), one of the major rivers in Bangladesh, flows along the western and south-western boundary of Ishwardi, shaping the geomorphology of the region. The presence of rivers, along with their associated erosional and depositional processes, has played a significant role in shaping the landforms and sedimentary patterns of Ishwardi Upazila.

== Climate ==
According to the Köppen climate classification, Ishwardi has a humid subtropical or tropical savanna climate.The weather is influenced by Indian monsoon. Much of the yearly rainfall is received from the south west monsoon. Generally, monsoon hits this region in the 2nd week of June and retreats at the end of October.

A weather observatory was established in Ishwardi in 1963. Since then, the observatory is recording weather data. Its International Station Number is 41907. Highest maximum temperature ever recorded in Ishwardi is 44 °C and lowest minimum temperature ever recorded is 3.5 °C; which were recorded on May 13, 1970, and January 27, 1964, respectively. Highest 24 hour rainfall of 351 mm was recorded on July 11, 1976, in Ishwardi.

Climate data for Ishwardi (1981–2010, extremes 1963-2013)
Month	Jan	Feb	Mar	Apr	May	Jun	Jul	Aug	Sep	Oct	Nov	Dec	Year
Record high °C (°F)	31.1 (88.0)	34.4 (93.9)	40.6 (105.1)	43.2 (109.8)	44.0 (111.2)	38.7 (101.7)	35.0 (95.0)	36.1 (97.0)	36.7 (98.1)	37.4 (99.3)	34.4 (93.9)	30.6 (87.1)	44.0 (111.2)
Mean daily maximum °C (°F)	24.2 (75.6)	27.7 (81.9)	32.9 (91.2)	35.5 (95.9)	34.7 (94.5)	33.5 (92.3)	32.4 (90.3)	32.5 (90.5)	32.4 (90.3)	31.7 (89.1)	29.5 (85.1)	26.6 (79.9)	31.1 (88.1)
Daily mean °C (°F)	16.5 (61.7)	19.9 (67.8)	25.0 (77.0)	28.6 (83.5)	28.9 (84.0)	29.0 (84.2)	28.5 (83.3)	28.8 (83.8)	28.3 (82.9)	26.6 (79.9)	22.6 (72.7)	18.2 (64.8)	25.1 (77.1)
Mean daily minimum °C (°F)	10.4 (50.7)	13.3 (55.9)	18.2 (64.8)	23.0 (73.4)	24.4 (75.9)	25.8 (78.4)	26.0 (78.8)	26.2 (79.2)	25.6 (78.1)	23.0 (73.4)	17.5 (63.5)	12.3 (54.1)	20.5 (68.9)
Record low °C (°F)	3.5 (38.3)	6.7 (44.1)	10.6 (51.1)	16.7 (62.1)	14.4 (57.9)	19.4 (66.9)	21.1 (70.0)	21.7 (71.1)	21.1 (70.0)	17.2 (63.0)	11.1 (52.0)	7.2 (45.0)	3.5 (38.3)
Average precipitation mm (inches)	6.2 (0.24)	22.2 (0.87)	33.3 (1.31)	77.0 (3.03)	167.7 (6.60)	237.5 (9.35)	298.9 (11.77)	218.2 (8.59)	292.7 (11.52)	110.3 (4.34)	16.3 (0.64)	8.4 (0.33)	1,488.7 (58.59)
Average rainy days	2	2	3	7	11	12	20	14	13	6	2	1	93
Average relative humidity (%)	76	70	63	66	75	83	86	85	85	82	77	77	77
Source: Bangladesh Meteorological Department

== Demographics ==
Religions in Ishwardi Upazila (2022)
Religion	Percent
Islam	96.48%
Hinduism	2.56%
Christianity	0.92%
Other or not stated	0.04%

According to the 2022 Bangladeshi census, Ishwardi Upazila had 99,220 households and a population of 390,402. 8.87% of the population were under 5 years of age. Ishwardi had a literacy rate (age 7 and over) of 78.14%: 78.08% for males and 78.19% for females, and a sex ratio of 102.72 males for every 100 females. 120,143 (30.77%) lived in urban areas.

According to the 2011 Census of Bangladesh, Ishwardi Upazila had 73,373 households and a population of 313,932. 62,542 (19.92%) were under 10 years of age. Ishwardi had a literacy rate (age 7 and over) of 54.96%, compared to the national average of 51.8%, and a sex ratio of 988 females per 1000 males. 66,255 (21.10%) lived in urban areas.

Majority of Ishwardi's inhabitants are ethnic Bengali who speak Bangla. Along with them, some Urdu speaking Bihari people also live here.

== Administration ==
Ishwardi upazila divided into Ishwardi Municipality and seven union council. The Ishwardi town is administrated by Ishwardi Municipality. Which is divided into 9 wards. And the railway Town Pakshy administrated by Pakshy Union Council. The administrative unit are;

- Municipality
  - Ishwardi Municipality
- Union Councils
1. Dashuria Union
2. Luxmikunda Union
3. Muladuli Union
4. Pakshi Union
5. Shahapur Union
6. Sara Union
7. Solimpur Union

=== Local government ===
The smallest rural local government unit in Bangladesh is Union council and the next upper level of this is Upazila Parishad. On the other hand, Municipal Corporation is the smallest unit for urban local government. Ishwardi thana was transformed into a upazila (sub-district) in 1982 by a government ordinance. As of 2022, the chairman of Ishwardi Upazila Parishad is Md. Nayeb Ali Biswas. Additionally, the current Vice Chairman is Md. Abdus Salam and Female Vice Chairman is Mst. Atia Ferdous. Ishwardi Upazila has seven Union councils: Dashuria, Luxmikunda, Muladuli, Paksey, Sahapur, Sara, and Solimpur. The union councils are subdivided into 128 mauzas and 126 villages. On the other hand, Ishwardi Municipality is the only municipality in the upazila. It is subdivided into 9 wards and 27 mahallas.

=== Executive Department ===
The current Upazila Nirbahi Officer of Ishwardi Upazila is P.M. Emrul Kayes.

== Agriculture ==
Ishwardi is a vast fertile plain which is suitable for agriculture. Paddy, wheat, sugarcane, betel leaf and vegetables are the main crops of this region. In addition, Litchi orchards are common in Ishwardi's households. This summer fruit is also considered as the 'cash crop' of Ishwardi.

Ishwardi is a hub for agricultural research institutes. The headquarter of Bangladesh Sugarcrop Research Institute (BSRI) is located here. This institute conducts research on crops like sugarcane, palm, date, stevia, sugar beet, nipa palm etc. Many varieties of these crops are developed and released from here. Bangladesh's only Pulses Research Center (PRC) is also situated here.

Along with these, Ishwardi contains regional research center of Bangladesh Agriculture Research Institute and Bangladesh Institute of Nuclear Agriculture. Moreover, Horticultural Center and Sericulture Development Board conduct their activity here.

== Transport ==
Ishwardi is well connected to the country's major cities by highways, railways and rivers. Lalon Shah Bridge and Hardinge Bridge connects Ishwardi Upazila to the south-western part of Bangladesh by highway and railway respectively. Ishwardi Railway Junction is one of the largest railway junctions in Bangladesh.

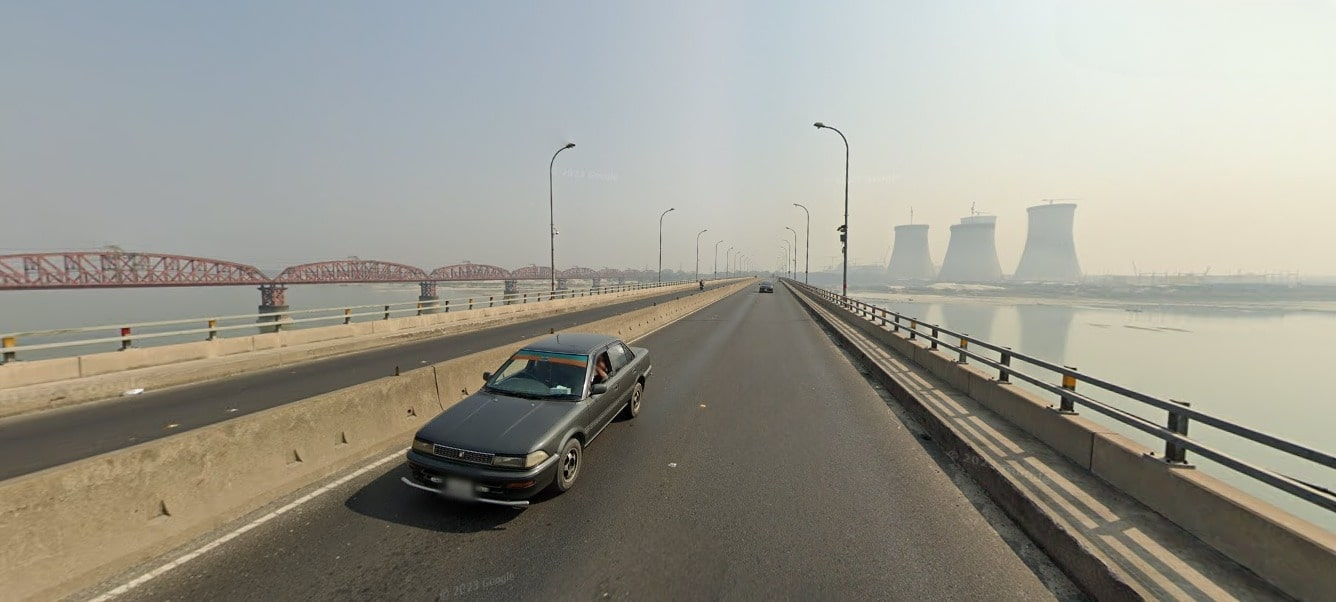
A sunny day on the Laon Shah Bridge from where the iconic Hardinge Bridge (left) and the Rooppur Nuclear Powerplant (right) can be seen

A port was also established in on the banks of Padma River to facilitate construction and future operation of Rooppur Nuclear Power Plant. The port became fully operational in 2020.

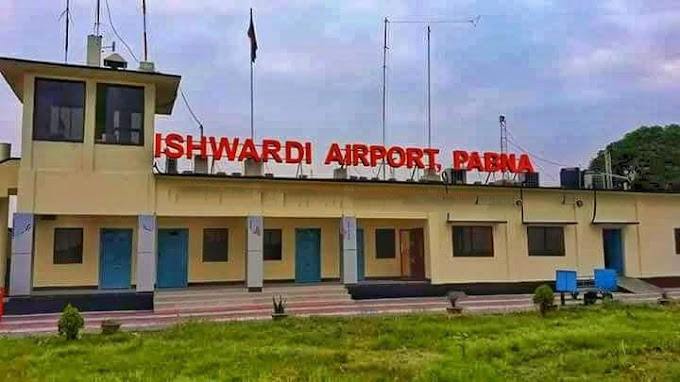
Ishwardi Airport, an airport located in Ishwardi Upazila

Ishwardi Airport is an airport located in Ishwardi which is currently not functional.

== Industry ==
=== Ishwardi EPZ ===
Ishwardi Export Processing Zone (EPZ) was established in 2001 on 308.97 acres of land as a special economic zone for producing export-oriented products. Investors from South Korea, India, Japan, China and Hong Kong have invested in Ishwardi EPZ. The EPZ mainly produces footwear & leather goods, wig, tent, industrial gloves, RMG, garment accessories, yarn, plastic goods, chemical & fertilizer, denim products etc.

=== Rooppur Nuclear Powerplant ===
Rooppur Nuclear Power Plant is a significant energy project located in Rooppur, Bangladesh. It is the country's first-ever nuclear power plant and a flagship venture in its pursuit of clean and sustainable energy. The power plant is being constructed on the banks of the river Padma, approximately 160 kilometers northwest of the capital city, Dhaka. Once fully operational, it will consist of two VVER-1200 reactors, each with a capacity of 1,200 megawatts. The Rooppur Nuclear Power Plant will play a crucial role in meeting the increasing energy demands of Bangladesh, diversifying its energy mix, and reducing its dependence on fossil fuels, thereby contributing to the nation's economic growth and environmental sustainability.

=== Pabna Sugar Mills Limited ===
Pabna Sugar Mills Limited is located in Ishwardi's Dashuria area. It was established in 1992 on 60 acres of land. It mainly used to produce sugar from sugarcane collected from nearby areas. Besides, it produced molasses, press mud and bagasse as by-product. As of June 2022, the mill was temporarily not functional and was going through modernization processes.

=== Banarasi Palli ===
After the partition of India in 1947, many Banarasi craftsmen migrated to Ishwardi from North Indian regions and started living in Ishwardi's Fateh Mohammadpur locality. They started weaving aristocratic sarees like Banarasi and Katan. Many of their descendants have preserved their ancestors' heritage till now. To expand the manufacturing and marketing of Banarasi products, Bangladesh Handloom Board established country's second-largest Banarasi Palli in 2004 at Ishwardi's Fateh Mohammadpur. But the Banarasi Palli was reported not to be fully functional. Many craftsmen are seen producing Banarasi sarees individually. The Banarasi Palli region remains very active during festivals like Eid.

== Education ==
Ishwardi Upazila has a handful of educational institutions. Some of the well-known secondary schools in Ishwardi are Ikkshu Gabeshawana High School, Bangladesh Railway Government Chandraprabha Vidyapitha, Govt. Sara Marwari Model High School and North Bengal Paper Mills High School. Among the higher secondary schools (or colleges, as they are termed in Bangladesh), Ishwardi Govt. College and Ishwardi Women's College are reputed. In addition, Bangladesh Open University operates their branch in Ishwardi. Besides, a Vocational Training Institute is also situated here. Apart from these, there are some madrasahs in Ishwardi namely Mazdia Babul Ulum Islamia Fazil Madrasah, Ishwardi Alia Madrasah, Autapara A B C Alim Madrasah and so on.

== Literary works ==
Celebrated Indian novelist Amiya Bhushan Majumdar's Bengali novel Garh Shrikhanda is based on the socio-economic condition of the Padma riparian areas of Ishwardi. This novel dates back to the 1940s. It was published in 1957 by Dey's Publishing at Kolkata.

== Notable residents ==
- Shankha Ghosh, Indian poet and literary critic, passed matriculation from Chandraprabha Vidyapitha, Ishwardi.
- Amiya Bhushan Majumdar, celebrated Indian novelist.
- Mozid Mahmud, poet, was born at Char Gargari village in 1966.
- Shamsur Rahman Sherif, MP, ex-minister of Ministry of Land, has been the Member of Parliament for constituency Pabna-4 since 1996.
- Nuruzzaman Biswas - Bangladeshi politician & MP.
- Abdul Bari Sardar - Bangladeshi politician & MP.

== See also ==
- Upazilas of Bangladesh
- Districts of Bangladesh
- Divisions of Bangladesh
