= Mohit Kumar Munshi =

British Indian Army Officer

Havildar Babu Mohit Kumar Munshi
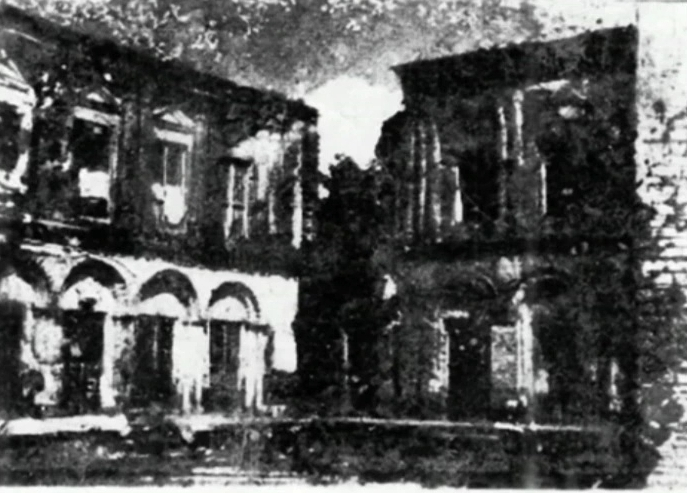
- Kadirpara Babu Bari, the birthplace of Munshi
- Born: c.1900 Kadirpara Babu Bari, Bengal, British India
- Died: c.1970s Hridaypur, West Bengal, India
- Other name: M. K. Munshi
- Education: Edward College, Pabna
- Occupations: soldier; writer; editor
- Known for: Participation in First World War
- Notable work: Three volumes of Brahmabidguru Śrīśrībhūpatinātha sannidhāne
- Father: Babu Prasanna Kumar Munshi
- Military career
- Allegiance: British Empire
- Branch: British Indian Army
- Service years: 1917–1920
- Rank: Havildar (Sergeant)
- Unit: 49th Bengalee Regiment
- Conflicts: World War I; Mesopotamian campaign
- Awards: British War Medal (1919)

Mohit Kumar Munshi, also spelt Mohitkumar Munsi (Bengali: মোহিতকুমার মুন্সী), was a soldier of British Indian Army, aristocrat, author and editor. He was one of the scions of the extended Munshi family of Kadirpara and Chougachi. He served as a non-commissioned officer, holding the rank of Havildar, in the 49th Bengali Regiment during the First World War. Munshi was one of the few aristocrats to join the Bengali Paltan, who belonged to a zamindar family, along with Khwaja Habibullah, the 5th Nawab of Dhaka, and Kumar Adhikram Mazumdar.

== Career ==
Munshi, the son of Babu Prasanna Kumar Munshi, joined the Bengali Regiment while studying in his second year at Edward College, Pabna, enlisting as an ordinary soldier in the 49th Bengali Regiment. He was later promoted to the rank of Havildar.

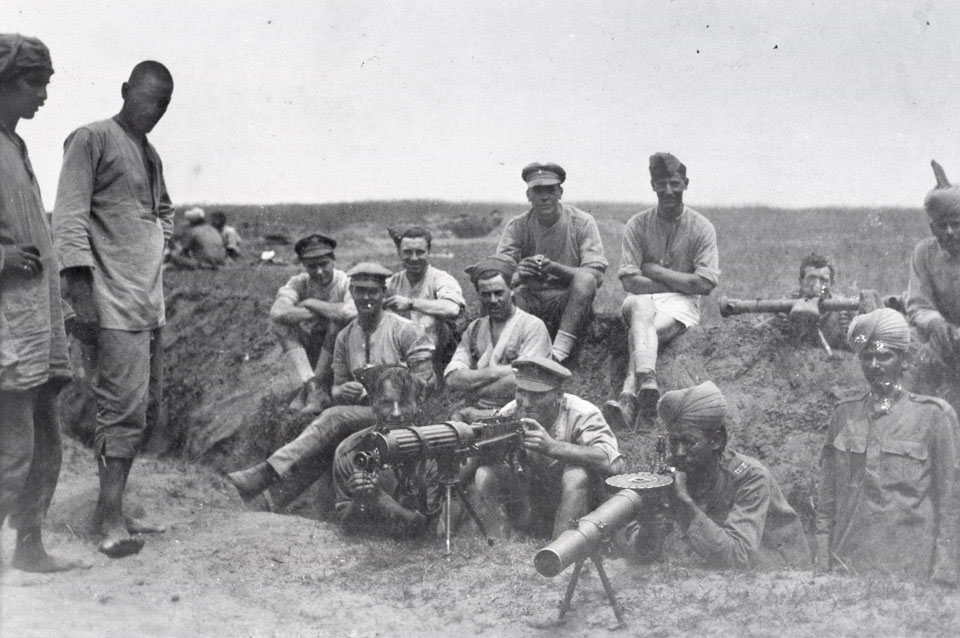
Machine gun unit of British and Indian troops in Mesopotamia, 1917. Munshi was also associated with military service during the campaign.

Following the cessation of hostilities in the First World War on 11 November 1918, King George V of the United Kingdom issued a decree designating 19 July 1919 as 'Peace Day'. On 19 July 1919, England hosted a Victory March and accompanying ceremonies to commemorate Peace Day. Three delegates from the 49th Bengali Regiment (Bengali Paltan) were invited to participate in the celebrations. On 25 June, the Officer Commanding and staff officers of the Karachi Brigade, Bengali Paltan, nominated Havildar Mohit Kumar Munshi, who was then serving as an instructor at the Karachi Brigade headquarters, along with Jamadar Ranada Prasad Saha and his orderly Sepoy Nittyagopal Bhattacharya, as the official delegates. In addition, a washerman and a sweeper were included in the delegation. According to Bandhan Sengupta and Sudin Chattapadhyay, on 27 June 1919, Munshi departed for London along with other delegates, via Bombay. Quartermaster Havildar Kazi Nazrul Islam was duly equipped with the appropriate uniform and other accoutrements for the delegates attending the peace celebrations.

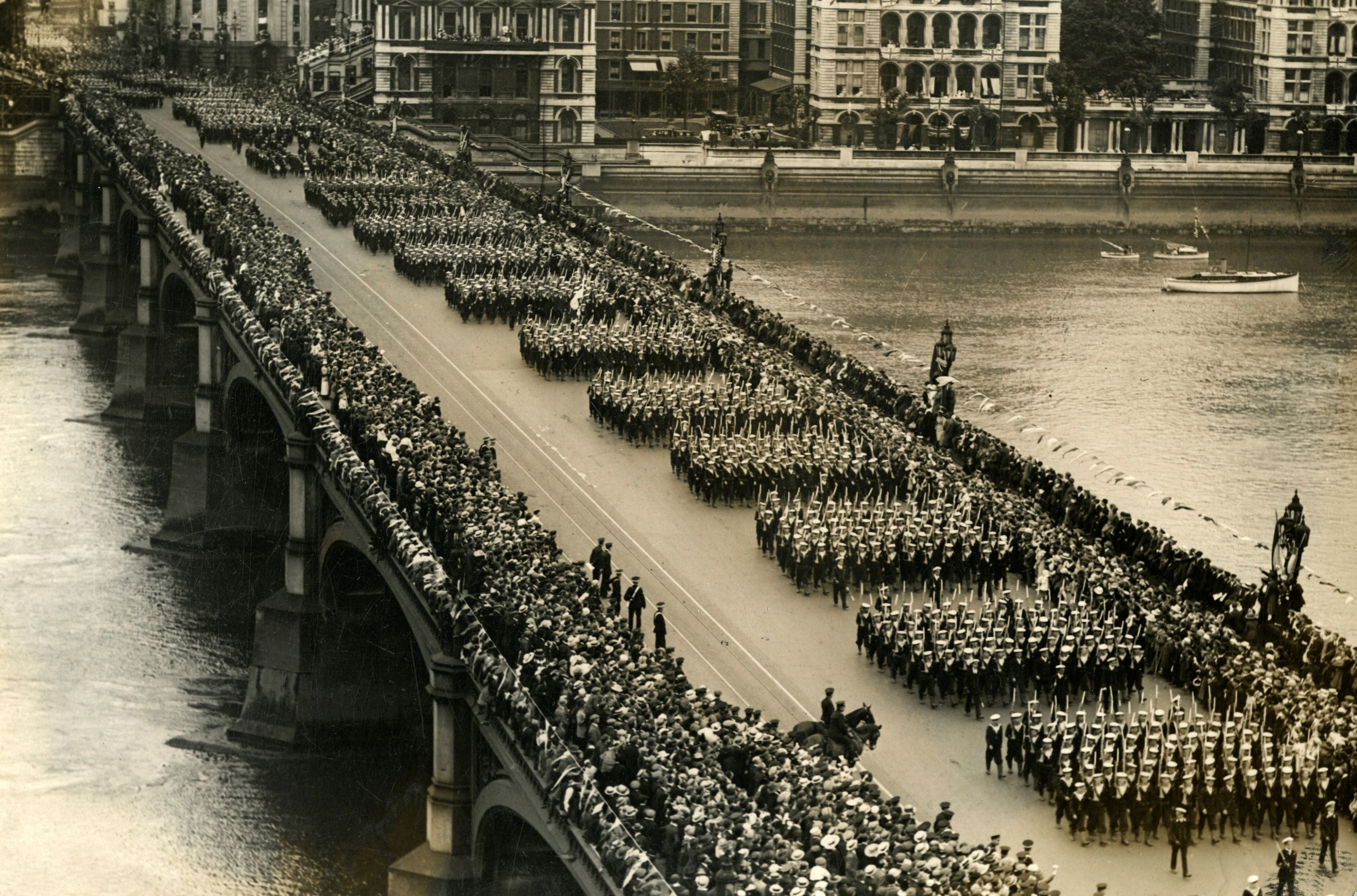
Sailors of the Royal Navy parade over Westminster Bridge. Munshi along with Jamadar Ranada Prasad Saha and Sepoy Nittyagopal Bhattacharya were also invited to attend the Victory March, representing the Bengali Regiment.

== Later life ==
Post-retirement from the British Indian Army in 1920, Munshi served as an inspector at the Central Telegraph Office, Calcutta. He never married. Later, he came into the spiritual association of his guru, Sri Sri Bhupatinath (Bhupatinath Mukherjee), who was an intimate disciple of Sri Ramakrishna.

Sri Sri Bhupatinath (Bhupatinath Mukherjee), the Guru of Munshi

In memory of his guru, Munshi, together with other spiritual siblings, acquired 20 bighas of land at Kora village near Hridaypur railway station in the Barasat subdivision and established an ashram, which was named Risabha Ashrama (also known as Sri Bhupati Math). The ashrama used to observe an annual festival on the birth anniversary of his guru. Munshi edited three volumes of the book titled Brahmabidguru Śrīśrībhūpatinātha sannidhāne dedicated to his Guru, which was published in three volumes in 1958 by the Asrama. His biography appears in the bengali book Munshianany Chollis Purush, edited by Santanu Ghosh, which highlights the contributions and accomplishments of the Munshi family across diverse fields. A review of the book was featured in Anandabazar Patrika in 2016.

The first volume of Brahmabidguru Śrīśrībhūpatinātha sannidhāne edited by Munshi

== See also ==
- Kazi Nazrul Islam
- Ranada Prasad Saha
- Khwaja Habibullah
- Bengali Regiment
- Kadirpara Estate
- Chougachi Estate
