= Pabna Government Polytechnic Institute =

Pabna Polytechnic Institute
- পাবনা পলিটেকনিক ইনস্টিটিউট
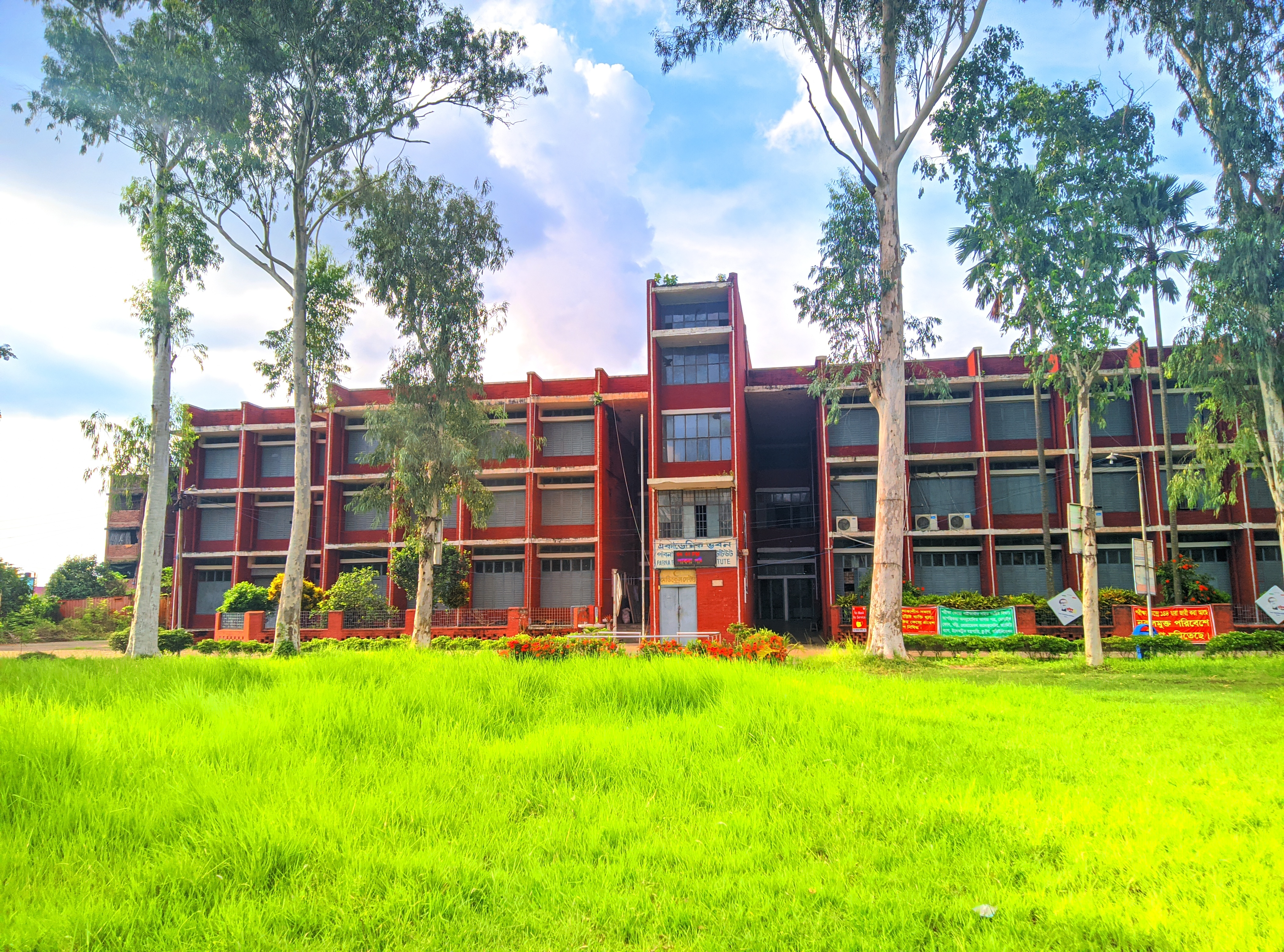
- Building of PPI Pabna
- Type: Government Polytechnic Institute
- Established: 1962; 64 years ago
- Principal: Md Humayun Kabir
- Academic staff: 157
- Students: 5200
- Location: Pabna sodor, Pabna, Bangladesh; 23°45′32″N 90°23′59″E
- Campus: 30 acars
- Website: pabna.polytech.gov.bd

Pabna Polytechnic Institute is a polytechnic institute located in Pabna, Bangladesh.

== History ==
The college was founded in 1924 when the Zamidar of Trash, Banomali Roy, in Pabna named BL Eliot Technical School. In the 1960s, the Government of East Pakistan established many Polytechnic Institute in different district of East Pakistan under Five-Year Plan. As part of the plan in 1962 that technical school becomes Pabna Polytechnic Institute. On 10 January 1970, Waker Ahmed, the Director of Technical Education founded the construction work of the Pabna Polytechnic Institute on 30 acres of land beside the north-east corner of Edward University College. Academic activities begin with three technologies Civil, Mechanical and Power in the new campus in 1978. now add new six technologies Electrical, electronics, computer, construction and refrigeration and airconditioning.

== Gallery ==
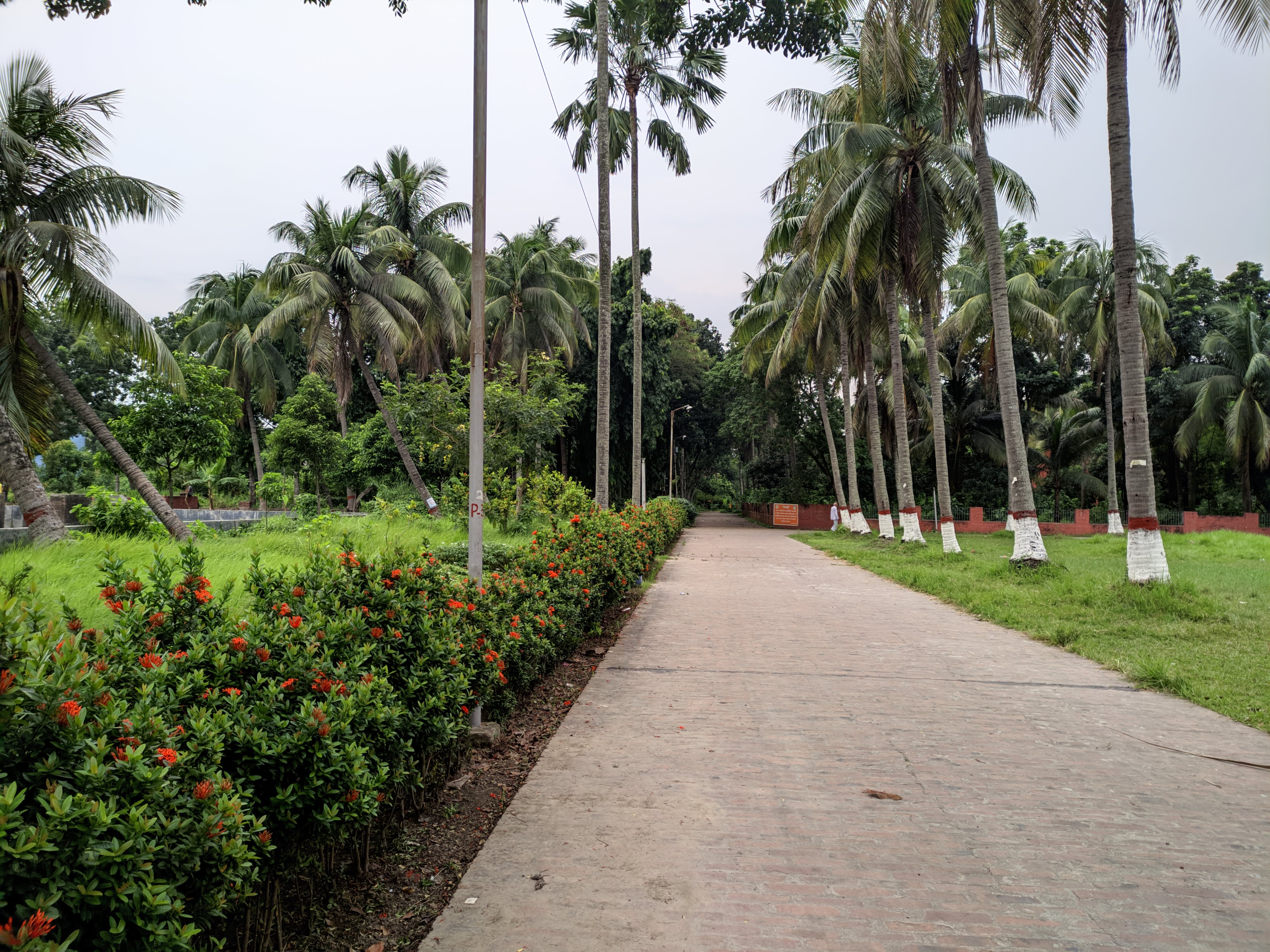
Pabna Polytechnic Institute, Pabna Campus Walking Road

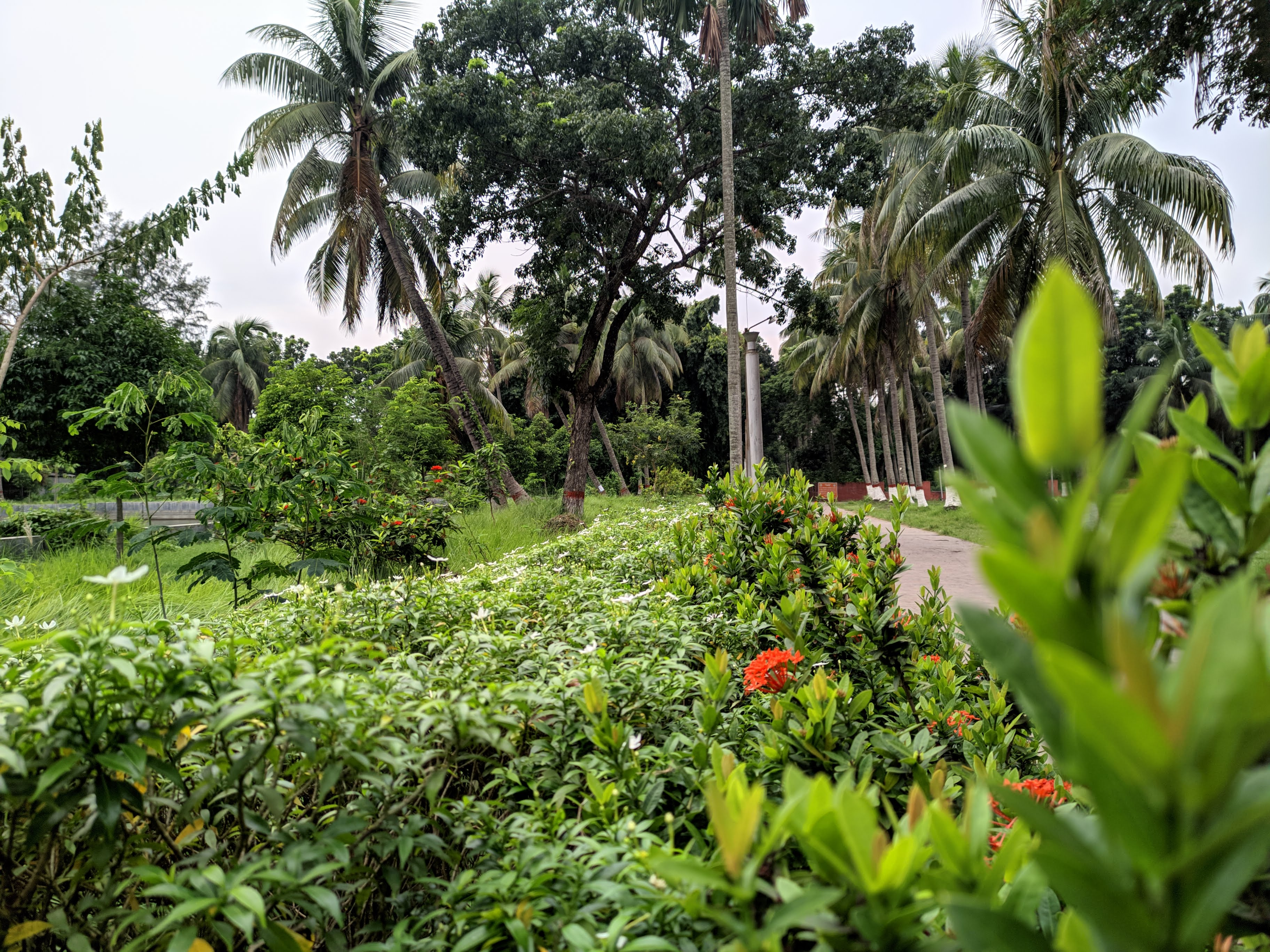
Pabna Polytechnic Institute, Pabna Campus Walking Road Flowers

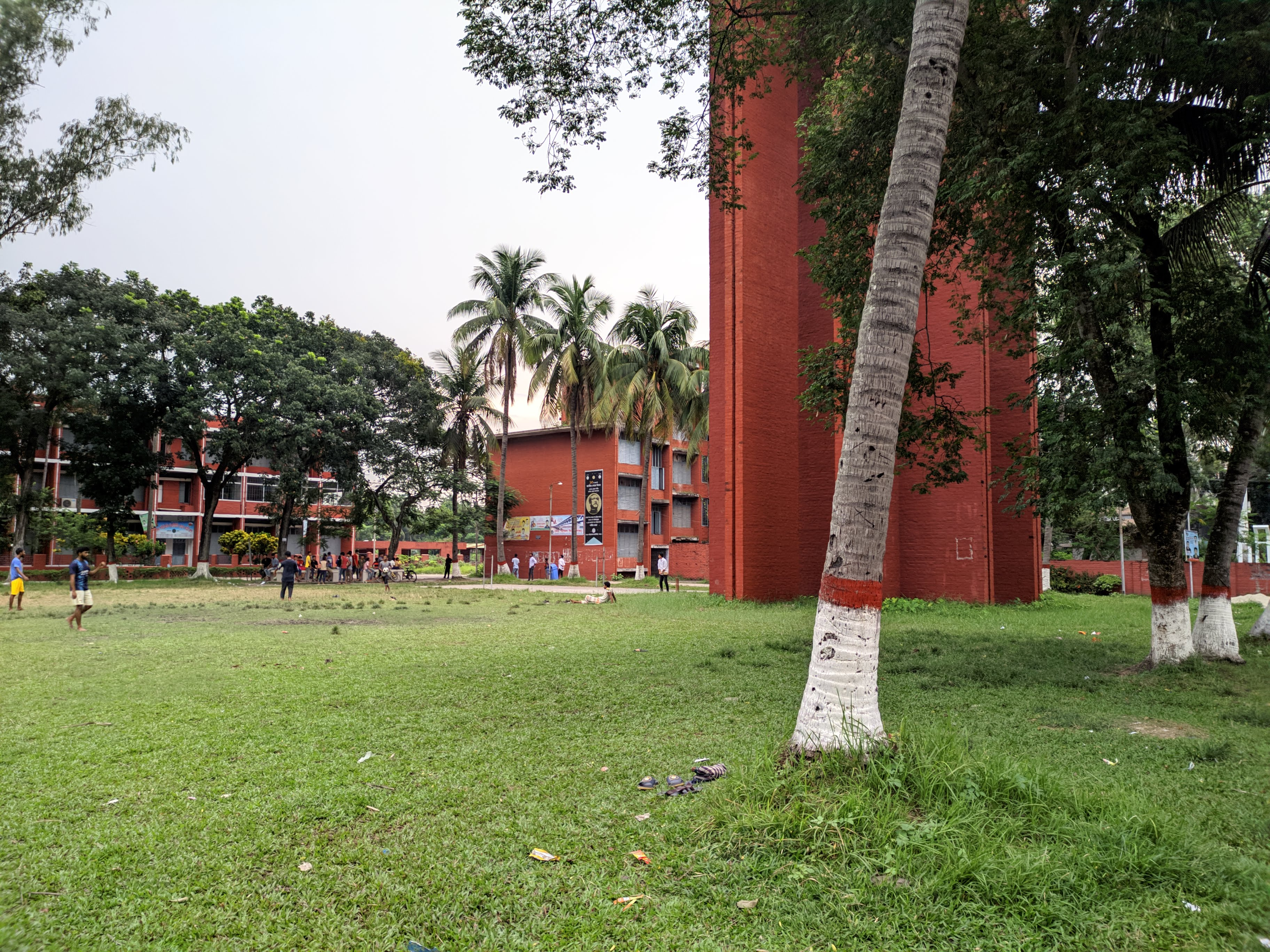
Pabna Polytechnic Institute, Pabna Campus Old Water Tank

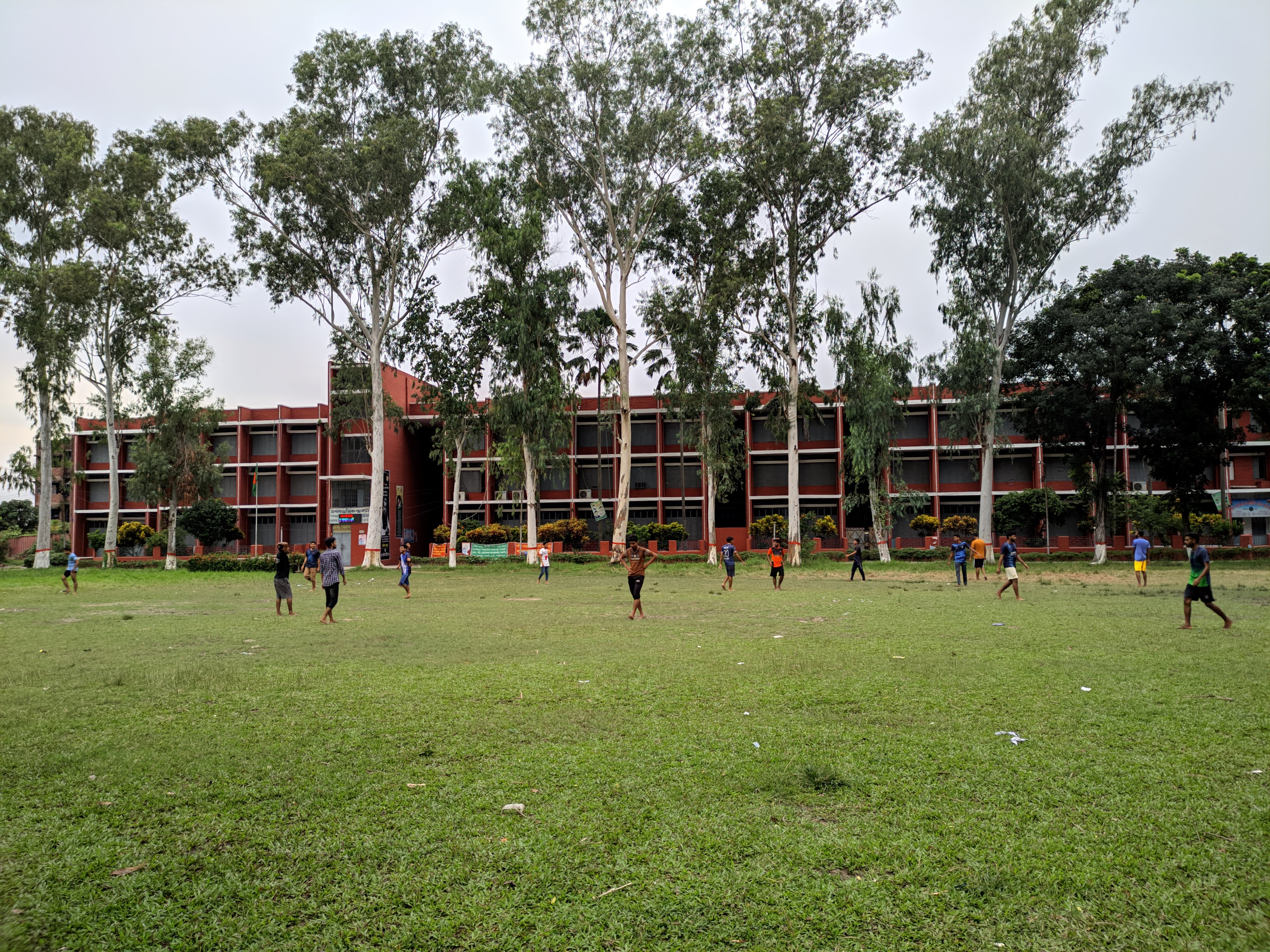
Pabna Polytechnic Institute, Pabna Campus Playground
