= Bengali Regiment =

Military unit, 1917 to 1920

The 49th Bengalee Regiment
- ৪৯তম বেঙ্গলি রেজিমেন্ট
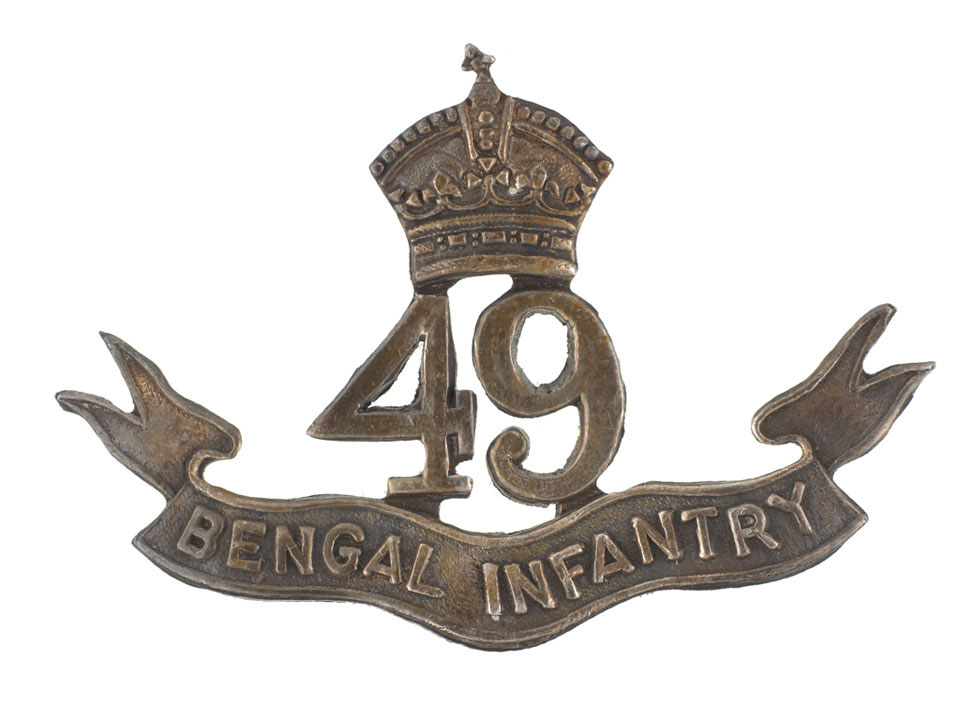
- Cap badge of The 49th Bengalee Regiment
- Founded: 26 June 1917
- Disbanded: 30 August 1920
- Country: British India
- Allegiance: British Empire
- Branch: British Indian Army
- Type: Infantry
- Size: 2 companies; each consisting of 228 soldiers
- Garrison/HQ: Fort William, India
- Nicknames: Bengali Double Company; The 49th Bengalee; 49th Bengal Infantry; Bengali Platoon; Bangali Paltan
- Anniversaries: 26 June
- Equipment: Lee–Enfield
- Engagements: World War I; Mesopotamian campaign; Kurdish rebellions

Commanders
- Regiment Commander: Lt. S. G. Taylor

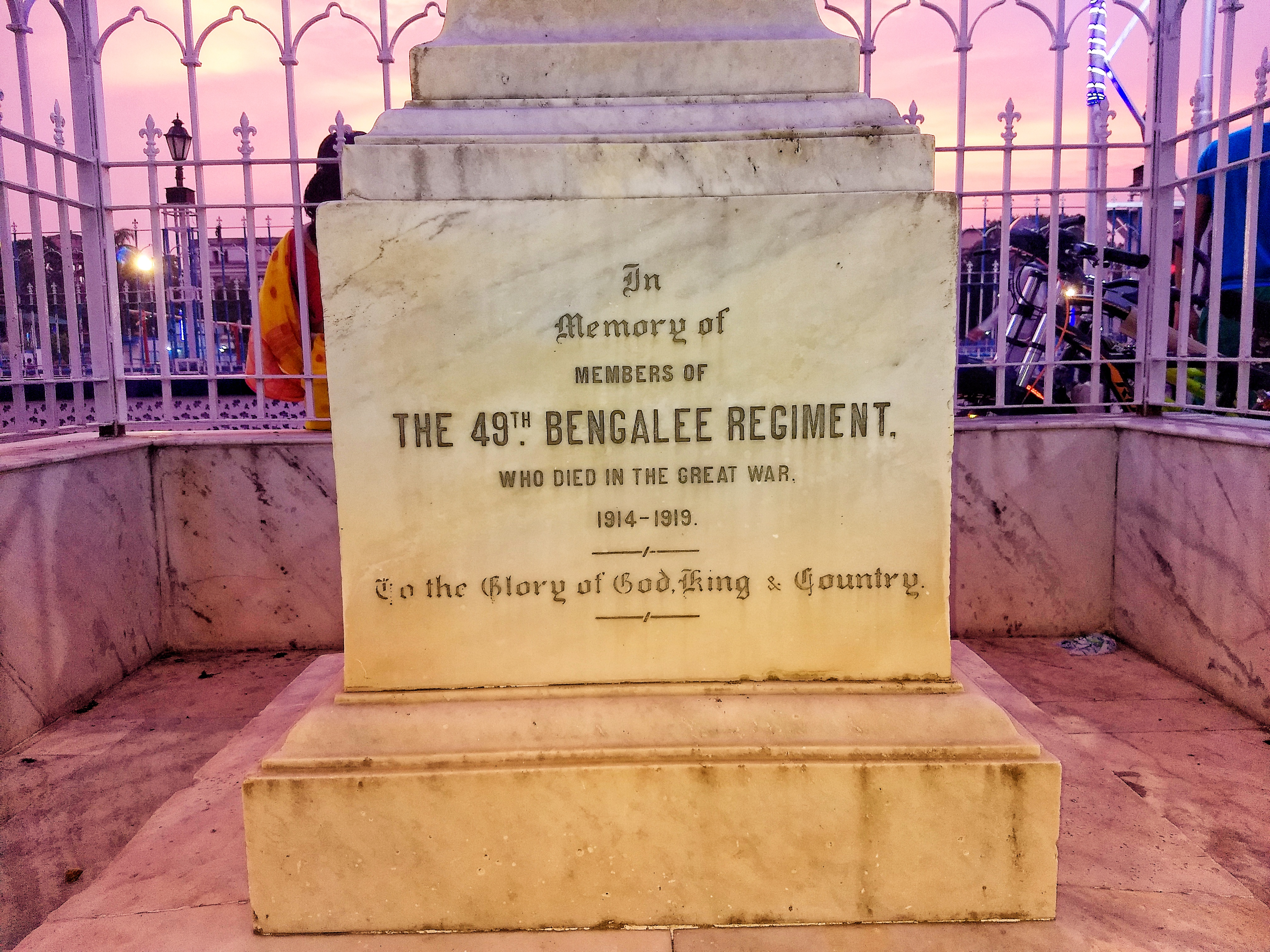
Monumental Plaque of The 49th Bengalee Regiment, College Street, Kolkata

The 49th Bengalee Regiment (Bengali: ৪৯তম বেঙ্গলি রেজিমেন্ট), also known as The 49th Bengalee, 49th Bengal Infantry, Bengali Double Company, Bengali Platoon and Bangali Paltan (বাঙালি পল্টন), was a military unit of the British Indian Army raised during World War I with Lt. S. G. Taylor as the Regiment Commander. In the beginning of the First World War, the army began to recruit many soldiers, non-combatants, and skilled and unskilled laborers from Bengal. In middle 1916, the British government decided to create a regiment of Bengali soldiers. At first, it was called Bengali Double Company. These double companies, each consisting of 228 soldiers, were integrated into the British Indian Army. The Bengali Double Company raised the first Bengali battalion on 26 June 1917. It was named The 49th Bengalee Regiment or briefly The 49th Bengalee. It was disbanded in 1920.

They fought in Mesopotamian campaign, and were stationed in Baghdad. After the end of World War I, they were used to crush a Kurdish rebellion in the Middle East. 63 soldiers in the unit died. Most of the recruits came from middle-class Bengali families. Notable soldiers in the unit included Khwaja Habibullah, Kazi Nazrul Islam, Ranadaprasad Saha, Mahbubul Alam, Mohit Kumar Munshi and Narendra Nath Dutta.

== Formation ==
Governor of Bengal Lord Carmichael announced to form Bengali Army companies at the concluding session of the Legislative Council in Dhaka On 7 August 1916. That time the leaders of Bengal also decided to form a Bengali Regiment Committee to extend cooperation to the government in recruiting companies. 90% of Soldiers of Bengal regiment were Bengali Brahmans of Varendra clan and region too, And then the central office was established in Calcutta (now Kolkata) and many branch offices were formed at all districts and at some major subdivisions. The committee ran campaigns through public meetings, newspaper publicity, and other means to enthuse people to join the Bengali Double Companies where important leaders, zamindars, and social leaders also attended these meetings. The government very earnestly solicited their cooperation. The programme to recruit Bengalis for the Double Companies began on 30 August 1916 at the Fort Williams Cantonment in Calcutta. The first ten soldiers of the Bengali Double Company left Calcutta on September 12 for Naushera for training. Subsequently, more groups of recruits left for Naushera. There the 46th Punjab Regiment was in charge of their training. The first regiment of 228 soldiers of the Bengali Double Company arrived in Karachi in January 1914 after four months of training at Naushera.

This Bengali Battalion was not like an ordinary army unit. Basically, young men from educated middle-class families had joined as soldiers. Many of them were in jobs with good salaries before joining the army. Some had graduation, masters or law degrees. Some young sons of nawabs and zamindars and of rich families also joined the Bengali Battalion. Although Indian soldiers were not allowed to rise as commissioned officers, but £115 million was paid from the Indian exchequer.

== In the war ==
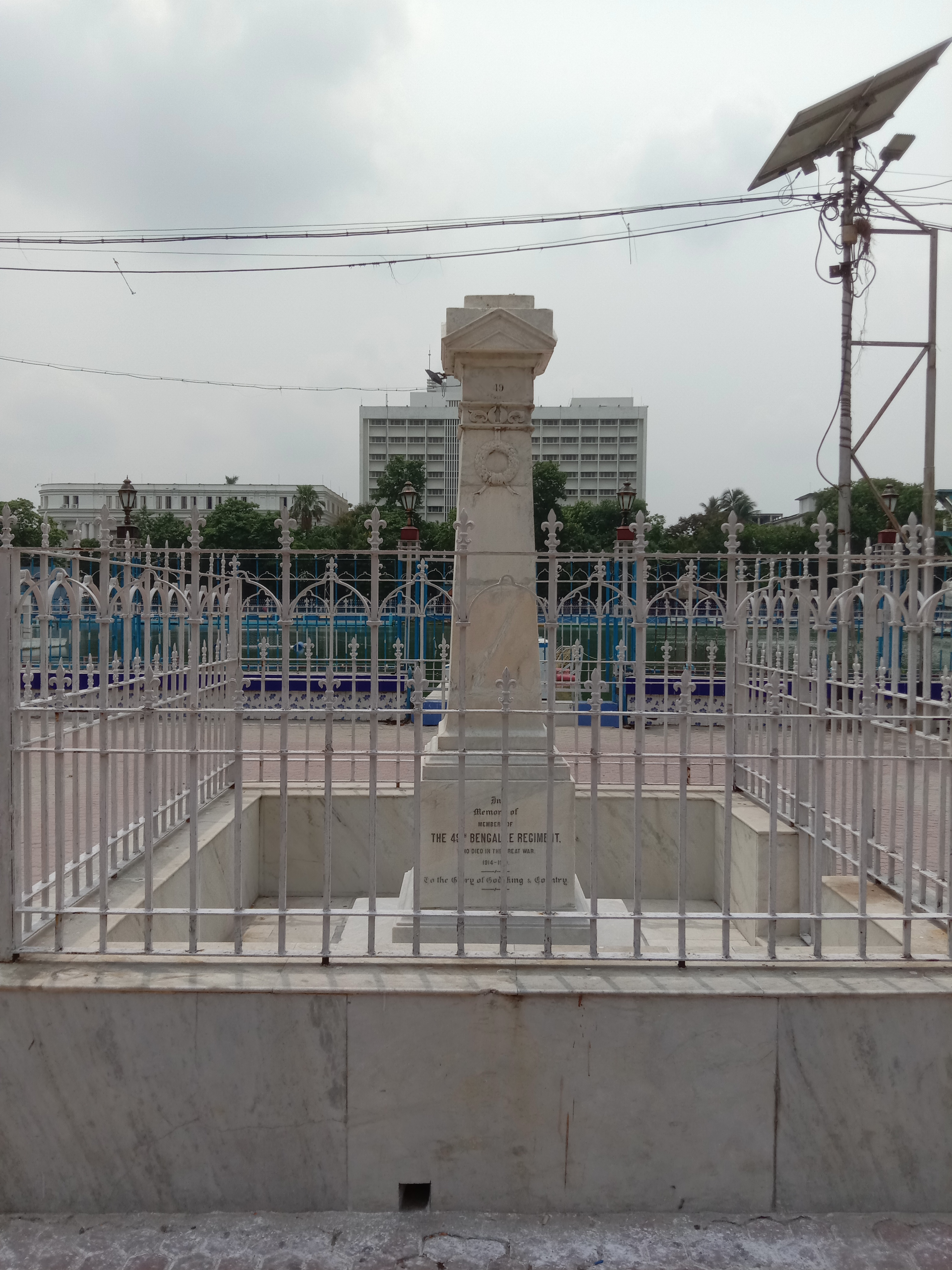
Monument in College Square

The first battalion of the Bengali Regiment divided into three groups left Karachi in July 1917 to take part in the Mesopotamian war and by mid-September reached Baghdad. But in Baghdad a good number of soldiers became sick and some of them died. So that the 49th Bengalis were transferred from Baghdad to the city of Azizia and by mid-March to Al Kut. Still, there was no significant improvement in their health in Al Kut. Then, towards the end of October, they were sent to Tanuma near Basra. While at Al Kut, Tanuma and Azizia, the Bengalis performed mainly security duties alongside receiving military training.

By November 1918 armistice was declared. At Tanuma the Bengalis performed the post-war rehabilitation duties. Some of the soldiers were engaged in Baghdad and elsewhere. After the Mesopotamian war, there was a revolt in Kurdistan in April 1919. As many as 235 Bengalis were engaged in suppressing this rebellion. After coming back to Kolkata in August 1920, the Bengali Battalion got disbanded on 30 August 1920.

After the first battalion of the 49th Bengali Regiment left for Baghdad in July 1917, its remaining soldiers stayed in Karachi and continued to receive military training. This group of the Bengalis was called Karachi Depot. A group of the Bengali Battalion that stayed in Calcutta was called Calcutta Depot where the new recruits stayed. The soldiers of the Karachi Depot also used to stay here while in transit from leave or on some duty. As a large number of soldiers from East Bengal were recruited in September 1918, a Depot was also opened in Dhaka called Dhaka Depot.

=== War diaries ===
There are two war diaries for the 49th Bengalee regiment that have been digitalized by National Archives of India.

● No 1:
◆ Date: 1 July 1917 to 30 April 1918
◆ Trigris Defences and Communication, Aziziyeh
◆ References: WO95/5020/5
◆ Notes:

== Monument in the memory of Bengalee Regiment ==
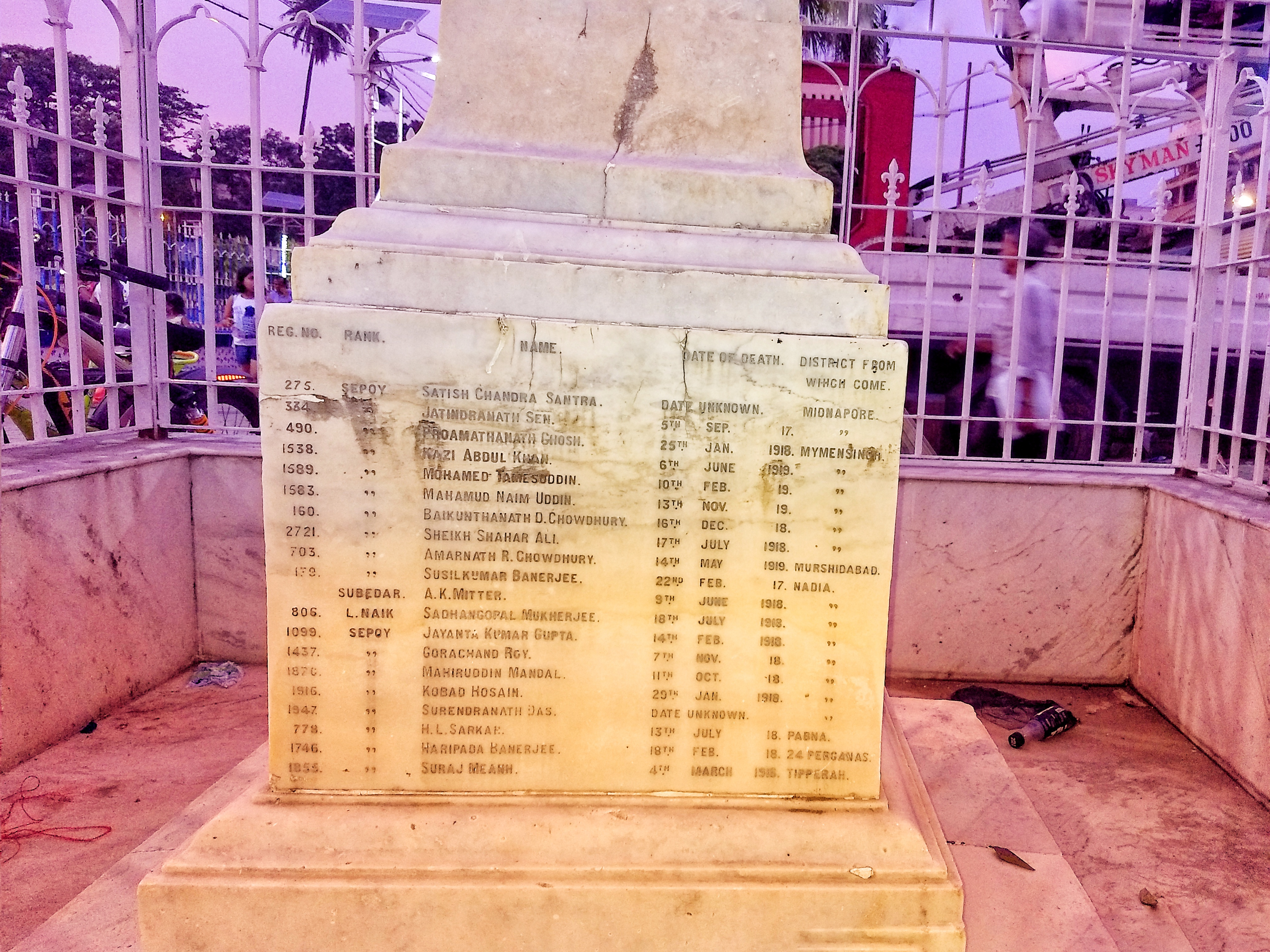
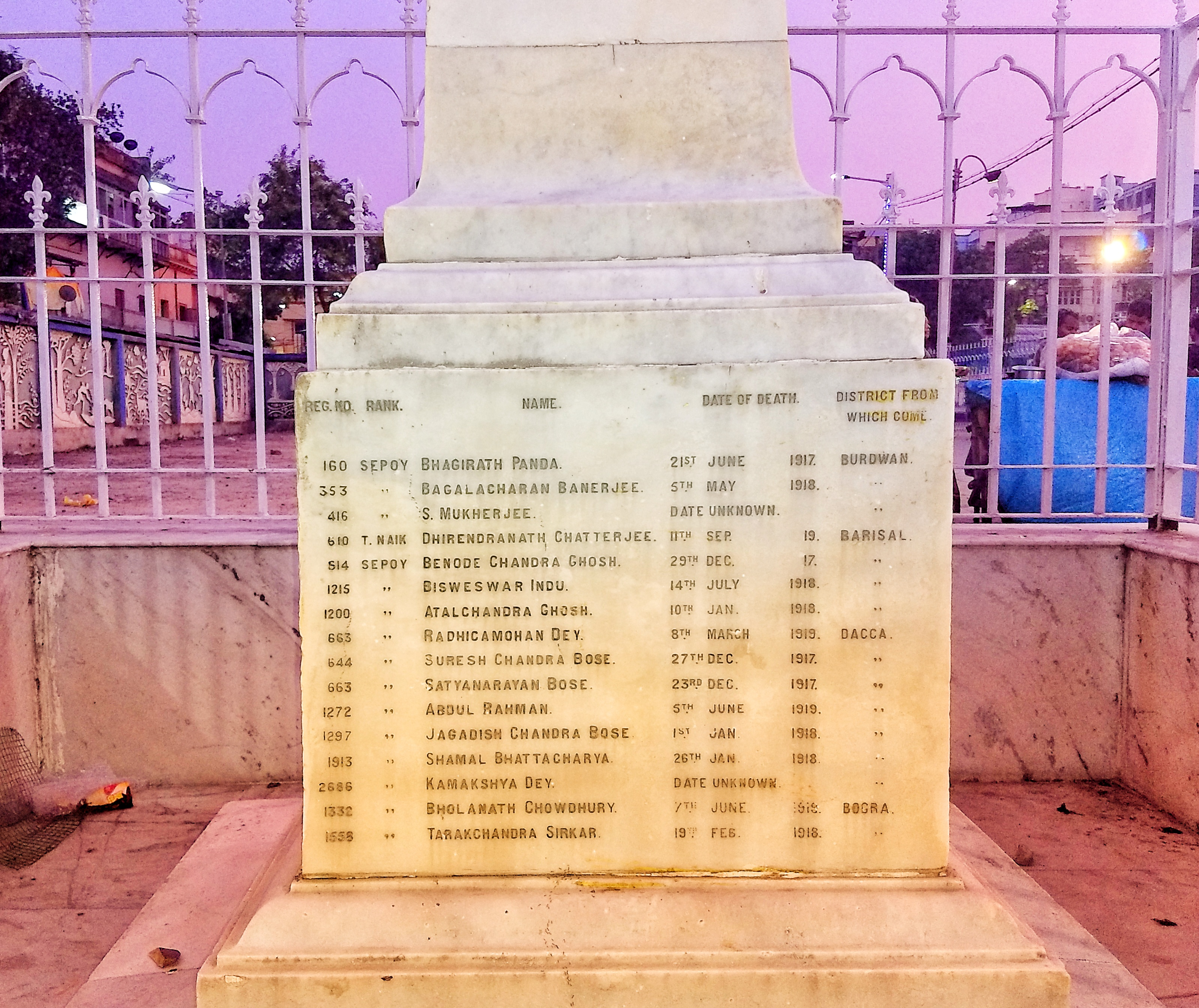
Name of Soldiers inscribed in the three side of the monument at College square in Kolkata

Sixty-three soldiers of the Bengali Battalion died of sickness and other causes. To honor their memory a commemorative statue was erected at Calcutta College Square in August 1924. In one side of the monument, inscribed in the words:

In Memory of Members of The 49th Bengalee Regiment Who Died in the Great War 1914-1919. To the Glory of God, King, & Country.

The other three sides of the memorial base contain the names of the 49 Bengalis killed in the Great War of 1914–1918. It also contains the following information of Reg. No., Rank, Date of Death, District from which come. The districts are Midnapore, Mymensingh, Murshidabad, Nadia, Calcutta, Jessore, Burdwan, Pabna, Chittagong, Khulna, Barisal, Faridpore, Pabna, 24-Parganas and Tripura (Tipperah). Some Bengali soldiers and officers received awards and recognition for their meritorious services in Mesopotamia. These recognitions were published in the official gazette. In July 1919 a victory march (rally) and peace celebration were held in London. Soldiers and officers from different parts of the world took part in it. One British officer and one Indian officer and two soldiers represented the 49th Bengali Regiment at this celebration.

== See also ==
- 49th Regiment of Bengal Native Infantry
- Bengal Native Infantry
