= Gopal Chandra Lahiri =

Feudal lord

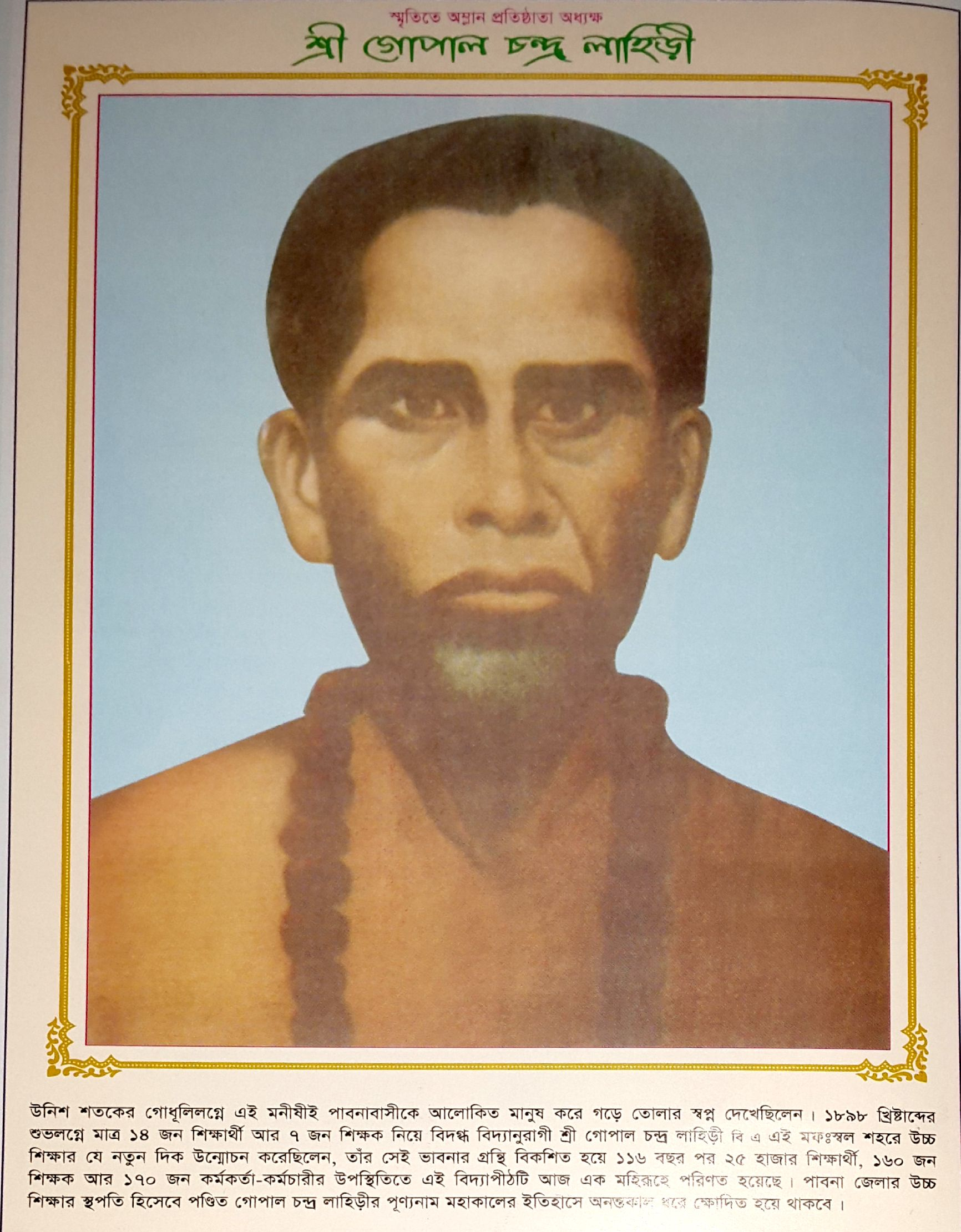
- Born: 1858; Rokonpur, Kacharipara, Gopalpur, Pabna District, Bengal Presidency, British Raj
- Died: 1936 (aged 77–78)
- Education: Rajshahi College
- Occupations: educator, feudal lord
- Known for: founder of Edward College

Gopal Chandra Lahiri (1858–1936) was a feudal lord and pioneer of education in Northern Bengal. He was the founder of Edward College in Pabna.

== Early life ==
Lahiri was born in 1858 in Rokonpur, Kacharipara, Gopalpur, Pabna District, Bengal Presidency, British Raj in a Jotdaari family. He studied at Rajshahi College. He lived in the house of Shrijukto Guruprasad Sen, a lawyer, in Rajshahi. He was the home tutor of Rajanikanta Sen, son of Shrijukto Guruprasad Sen, who went on to become a notable poet of Bengal. He graduated from Rajshahi College with a bachelor's degree in 1882.

== Career ==
In March 1884, Lahiri founded the Pabna Institution, English curriculum school, in Pabna. The school was financed by Bhaduri zamindar family also known as the Tahirpur Raj family. He was the principal and headmaster of the institution. He founded Pabna Institution (college) in July 1898 and affiliated with the University of Kolkata. It was renamed to Pabna College in 1906 and would later be renamed to Edward College in 1911, after King Edward VII, emperor of India. It would later be affiliated with the University of Rajshahi.

Lahiri served as the principal of Edward College till 1914. He was succeeded by Roy Radhika Nath Bose.

== Death and legacy ==
Lahiri died in 1936. After his death, the Pabna Institution' (school) was renamed to Gopalchandra Lahiri Institution. Gopal Chandra Institution High School is one of the oldest high schools in Pabna District. Edward College is the oldest college in Pabna District.
