= Mahbubul Alam (writer) =

Bengali author and historian (1898–1981)

- মাহ্‌বুব-উল আলম
- Pronunciation: [ˈmaɦbuˌbul ˈalɔm]
- Born: 1 May 1898; Fatehpur, Chittagong, Bengal Presidency, British India (now Chattogram, Bangladesh)
- Died: 7 August 1981 (aged 83); Chittagong, Bangladesh
- Education: Chittagong College
- Occupations: Writer; journalist; editor; historian; civil servant; soldier
- Years active: 1917–1981
- Spouses: Zulekha (m. 1916, died) Rahela Khatun (died)
- Parents: Nasir Uddin (father); Azimunnesa Begum (mother)
- Awards: Adamjee Literary Award (1963); Bangla Academy Literary Award (1965); Presidential Pride of Performance (1965); Ekushey Padak (1978)
- Writing career
- Language: Bengali
- Period: Modern
- Genres: Fiction; memoir; nature writing
- Subjects: History; nature; military
- Notable works: Mafizan; Momener Zabanbandi; Paltan Jibaner Smriti; Chattogramer Itihas; Bangalir Muktiyuddher Itibritta
- Military career
- Allegiance: British Empire
- Branch: British Indian Army
- Service years: 1917–1920
- Unit: 49th Bengalee Regiment
- Conflicts: World War I; Mesopotamian campaign

Mahbubul Alam (Bengali: মাহ্‌বুব-উল আলম, IPA: [ˈmaɦbuˌbul ˈalɔm]; 1 May 1898 – 7 August 1981) was a Bangladeshi writer, journalist, historian, soldier, and civil servant. He won Bangla Academy Literary Award in 1965 and Ekushey Padak in 1978.

== Early life ==
Alam was born in Fatehpur, Chittagong on 1 May 1898 to Moulavi Nasih Uddin and Azimunnessa Begum. He was the second son. He secured a job with the Government Registration Department and served until retirement in 1955 as an inspector of registrations.

== Career ==
In 1917, Alam joined the 49th Bengali Paltan of British Indian Army, He served in the Signal Corps and Mahbub spent about three years at different stations in Mesopotamia (present day Iraq) before being finally released in 1920, when the Paltan was broken up.

== Works ==
In Bangla prose, Alam is a writer of fiction and historian. His literary works were included in the curriculum of school level, secondary, higher secondary and graduation level Bengali literature in Bangladesh.

== Novels ==
=== Mofizon ===
Alam can be said to have written one novella, titled Mofizon, and one novel, Momener Jabanbondi Mofizon is on a theme of the suppressed libidinal instinct in human nature. This short fiction provides a bold treatment of feminine sexual arousal and suppression working simultaneously at a time when Bengali society was not ready for it. It was, therefore, criticised by the conservative section of the Muslim society, but Poet Sufia Kamal, a noted female contemporary writer of Mahbub's wrote very succinctly that everybody blamed "Mofizon"but nobody understood Mofizon's pains. The superstitious male attitude towards marriage and women is also criticised in this novella.

=== Momener Jabanbandi ===
Mahbub's most well-known work, translated into English by Lila Roy as The Confession of a Believer is a novel—as the title suggests, on autobiographical elements—that portrays the central character as having gone through the continuous biting of the conscience mainly on moral grounds. As is Mahbub's habit to approach critical issues, the beginning of the novel contains a fictional discourse run by the child-protagonist about the existence of God. The later part of the novel shows the adult-protagonist as having overcome the temptation of seductive attractions from a married woman. This novel is rich in Mahbub's style of writing in bold, clear and precise sentences.

== Short story collections ==
Tajia

A collection of short-stories, which mainly deals with religious bigotry, while Pancha Anna (meaning a co-mixture of themes), another volume, which has short stories dealing with super naturalism, famine, domestic affairs and marriage. After his death, four volumes of humorous short stories were published, which are: Pradhan Otithi and Taza Singhi Macher Jhol (The chief guest and the gravy of the freshly cooked catfish),

Rongberong (Varieties), Paltan, (Warfront), and Sat Satero (multiplicities).

== Other works ==
Paltan Jiboner Smriti

With this book's publication in 1935 Mahbub arrived on the literary scene of the undivided Bengal. The book was first serialized in the monthly Mohammadi published from Kolkata, and it at once caught the attention of the readers for Mahbub's verve in storytelling. Recollecting his days of war in Mesopotamia, Mahbub brings to life in bold humorous strokes his encounters with people in the kind of his Scottish boss, a lieutenant general, who presented him with a Robert Burns volume for his honesty, his co-mates and their pranks, cooks and guards of the camp, his sickness, the malaria epidemic in the quarters, and Iraqi date-tree gardens and their women.

Gomf Sandesh

The stories in this book explore the relationship between Muslims and Hindus in Bengal society. The work is noted for its use of humor in unexpected moments.

Bangalir Muktijudhdher Itibritta

It is a mammoth task drawing up a documentary history of the Liberation War that ended in the creation of Bangladesh. A 670-page long 4 volume history, this book, compiled over two years by an elderly he at the age of 73 to 75, is often considered as the first documented history on the subject. Mahbub visited hundreds of villages all over Bangladesh and interviewed several hundred people to collect information about the guerrilla warfare as well as the conventional war. Another book along this line, titled Bangaleer Samorik Oitijhya (The Military Tradition of the Bengalis), published recently contains unpublished writings of Mahbub as well as old entries from Paltan Jiboner Smriti.

Besides, under a UNESCO project. Mahbub produced a number of books describing the flora and fauna of the then East Pakistan (present day Bangladesh) and their habitat. These picturesque books on plants, birds and animals of Bangladesh are, unfortunately, not available now.

== Personal life ==
While Mahbub Alam was studying at Chittagong College, he married his distant relative Julekha. She died leaving seven children behind (three of whom died as infants), and he then married Rahela Khatoon, who gave birth to eleven children, and survived him by 26 years. On retirement, Mahbub took interest in social welfare and published a weekly newspaper, titled Zamana (meaning the current days), which he later on converted into a daily. Mahbub died in his own house at Kazir Dewry, Chittagong on 7 August 1981. His American writer-friend Robert C. Hammock wrote a chapter on Mahbub in his book Below the Llano Estakado.

== Award ==
- Adamjee Literary Award (1963)
- Bangla Academy Literary Award (1964)
- President's Pride of Performance (1965)
- Ekushey Padak (1978)
