= Govt. Edward College, Pabna =

College in Pabna, Bangladesh

Coordinates: 24.012°N 89.239°E

Government Edward College, Pabna
- সরকারি এডওয়ার্ড কলেজ, পাবনা
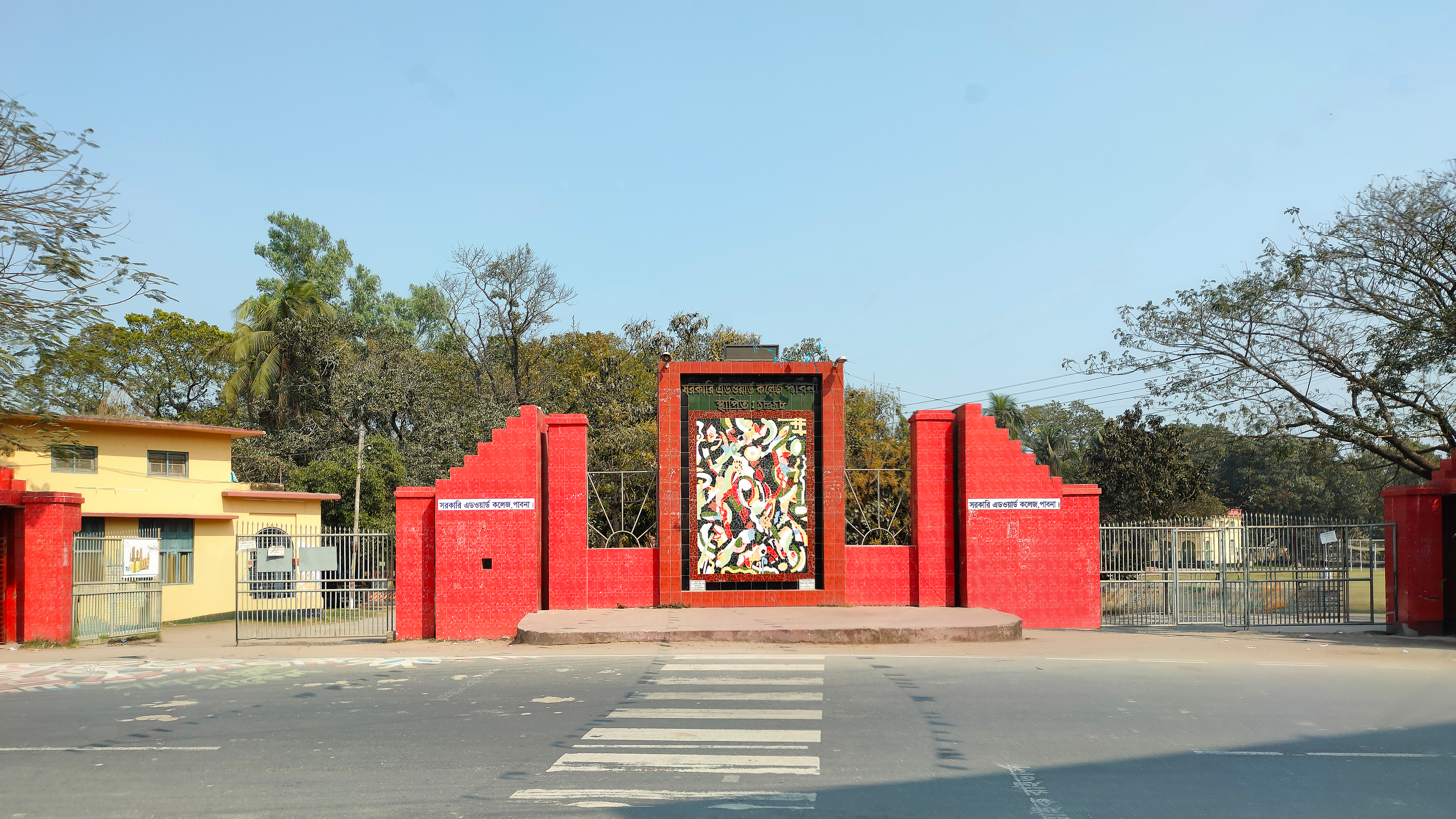
- Type: College
- Established: 1898; 128 years ago
- Founder: Gopal Chandra Lahiri
- Academic affiliations: National University, Bangladesh
- Principal: Muhammad Abdul Awwal Mian
- Academic staff: 160
- Administrative staff: 118
- Students: 30,052
- Undergraduates: 5,000
- Postgraduates: 1,000
- Other students: 1,200^{a}
- Location: Pabna, Rajshahi, Bangladesh
- Campus: Urban
- Language: Bengali; English
- Colours: White and Black
- Website: gecp.edu.bd

Govt. Edward College, Pabna is one of the oldest colleges in Bangladesh.

== Departments ==
Government Edward College has the following academic departments:

- Bangla
- English
- Philosophy
- History
- Islamic History and Culture
- Islamic Studies
- Political Science
- Economics
- Sociology
- Physics
- Mathematics
- Chemistry
- Botany
- Zoology
- Information and Communication Technology (ICT)
- Accounting
- Management
- Marketing
- Finance and Banking

== History ==
It was established in July 1898 in Pabna. The college was first named as "Pabna Institution" and founded by Gopal Chandra Lahiri, a pioneer of education in northern Bengal.

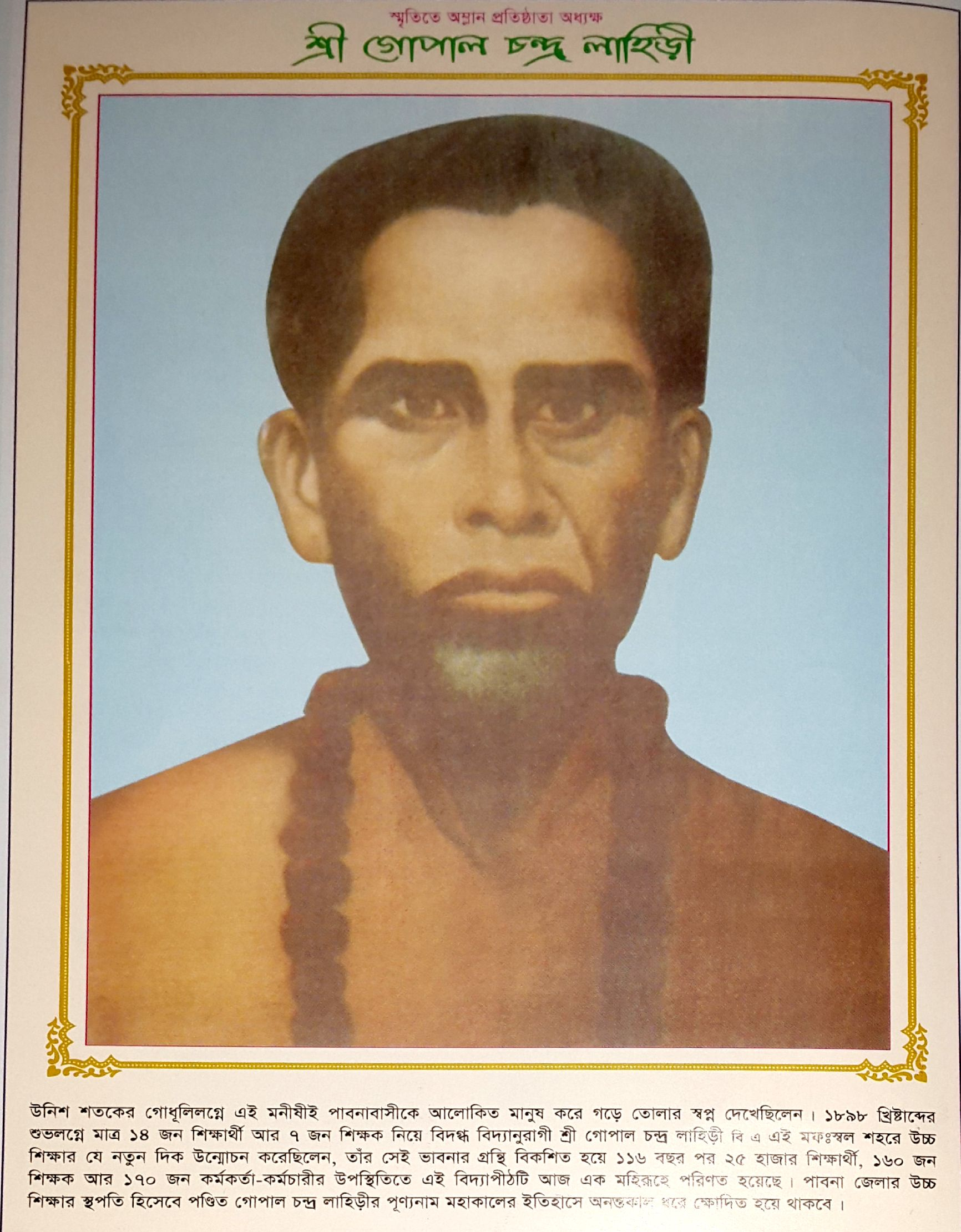
Shree Gopal Chandra Lahiri

This college was later named "Pabna College" in 1906. The college motto was "Knowledge is virtue". Afterwards, Pabna College was named as "Edward College" after Edward VII.

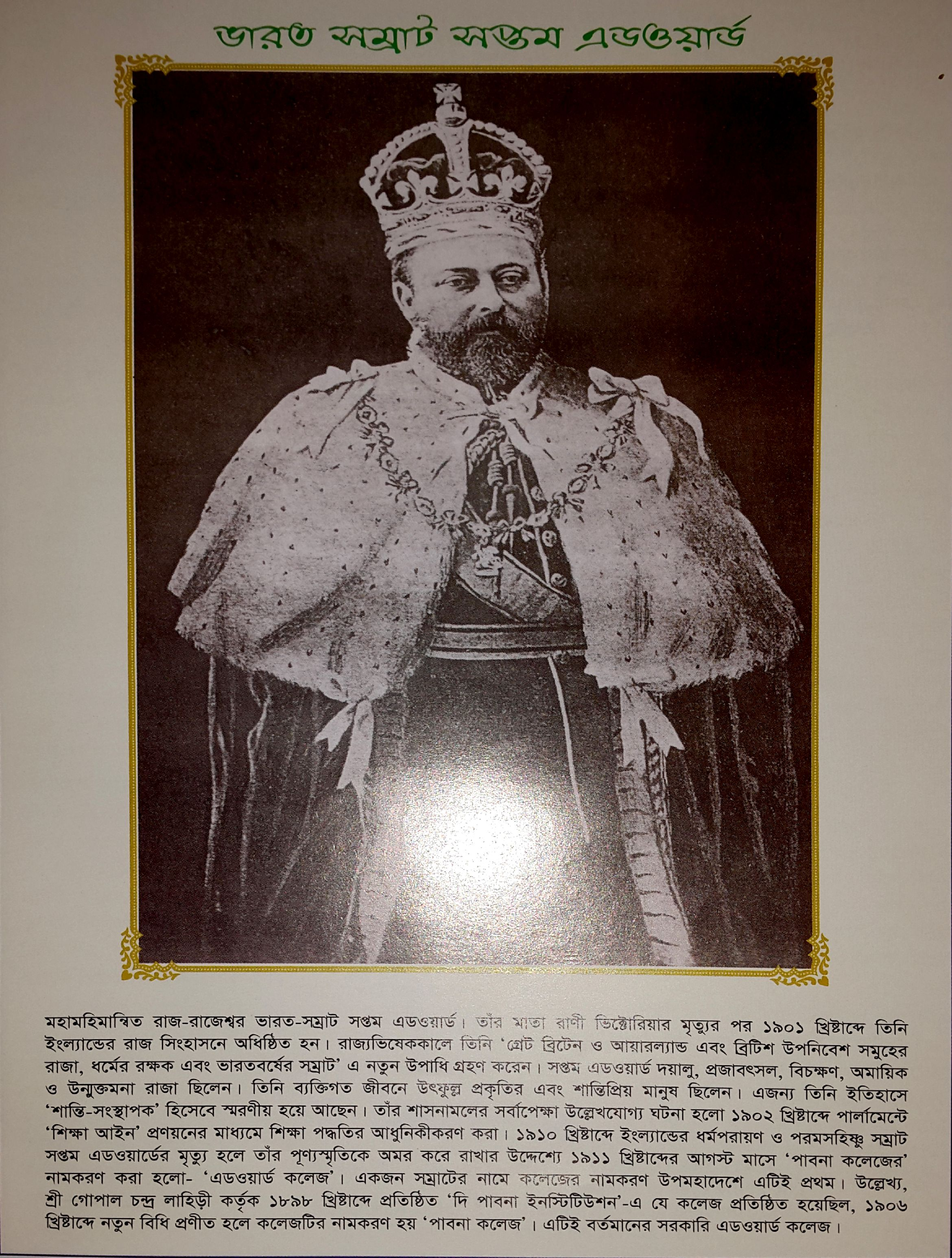
Emperor Edward the VII

In December 1898, the college was affiliated under Calcutta University. Many distinguished personnel visited the college. The then first Governor General of Bengal, Lord Tomas David Barron Carmichael visited Edward College and donated Tk. 50000 for the development of the college in 1912. The then Zamindar of Tarash, Pabna, Ray Bahadur Banamali donated Tk. 50000 to the development fund of the college. Many kindhearted persons of education lovers contributed to the development of Edward College. Shreemati Gopi Sundari Dashi and Shree Devendra Narayan Singh donated 46 Bighas of land to Edward College.

On July 20, 1914, Professor Radhikanath Bose was appointed as the Principal of Edward College, Pabna.

Honors courses were introduced in 1954 in Bengali and Economics under Calcutta University.

On March 1, 1968, Edward College was nationalized by the then government of Pakistan. Edward College then became Govt. Edward College.

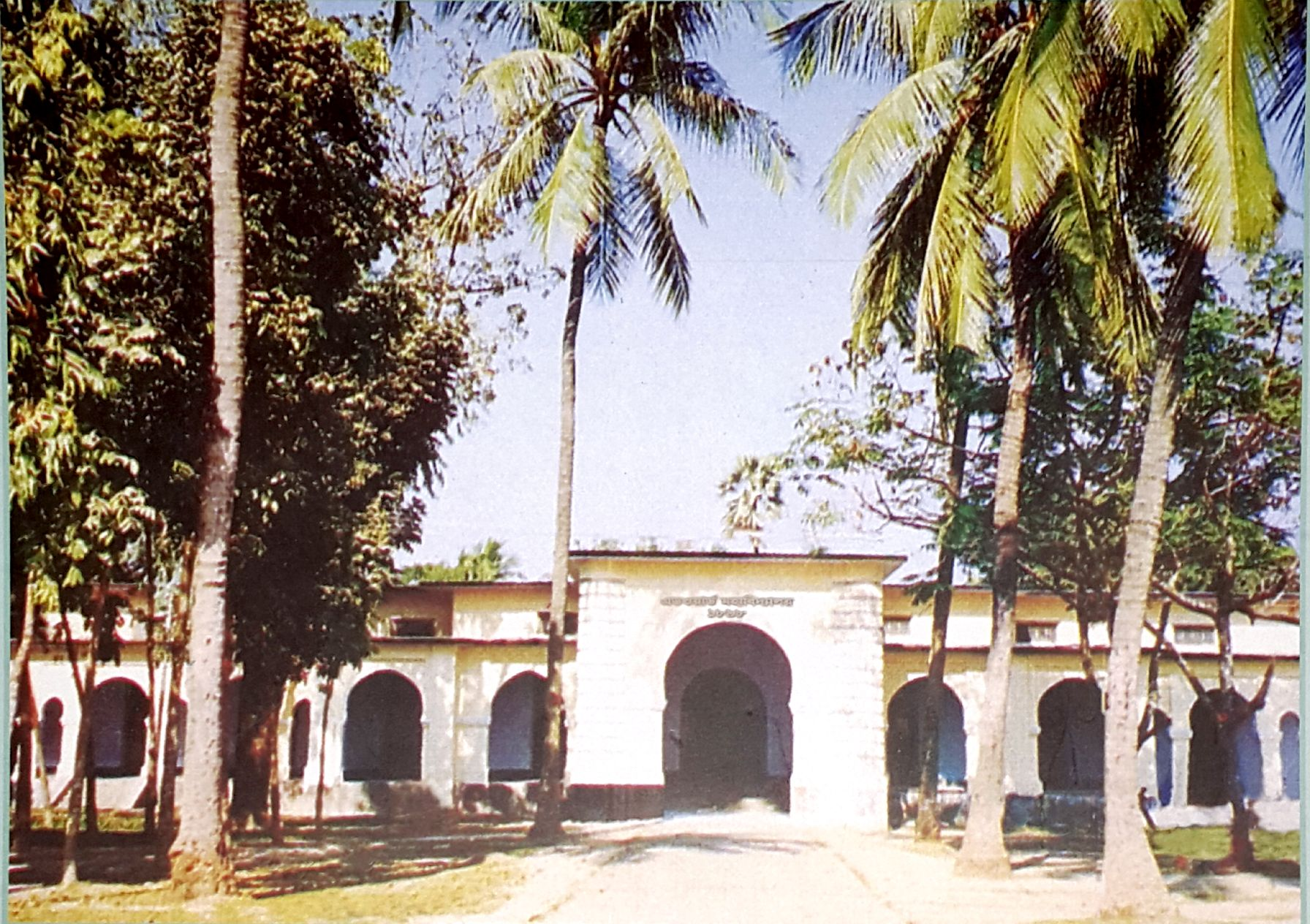
Govt. Edward College, Pabna at early stage

Nowadays this college plays a vital role in education sector in Bangladesh. Honors and Masters courses of 16 subjects are being taught here. Besides, BA pass course, B.Ss, B.Sc. courses are also being taught.

Total number of regular students are 25,052. Total number of teachers and supporting staffs are respectively 160 and 118.

== Noble alumni ==
- Mohammed Shahabuddin, former President of Bangladesh
- Mohit Kumar Munshi
- Arun Kumar Basak
- Kamal Lohani
- Charu Majumdar

== Gallery ==
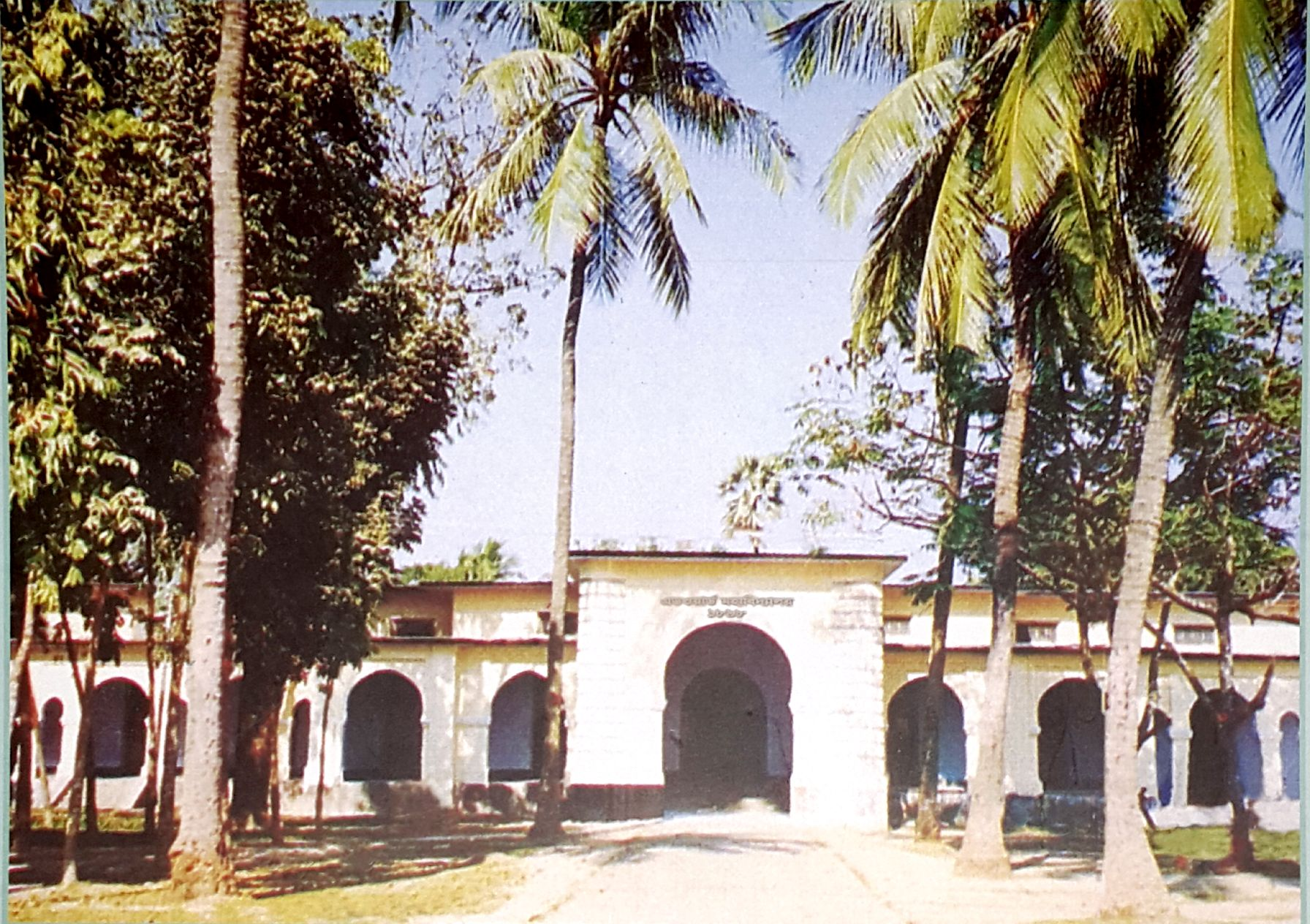
Old Photo

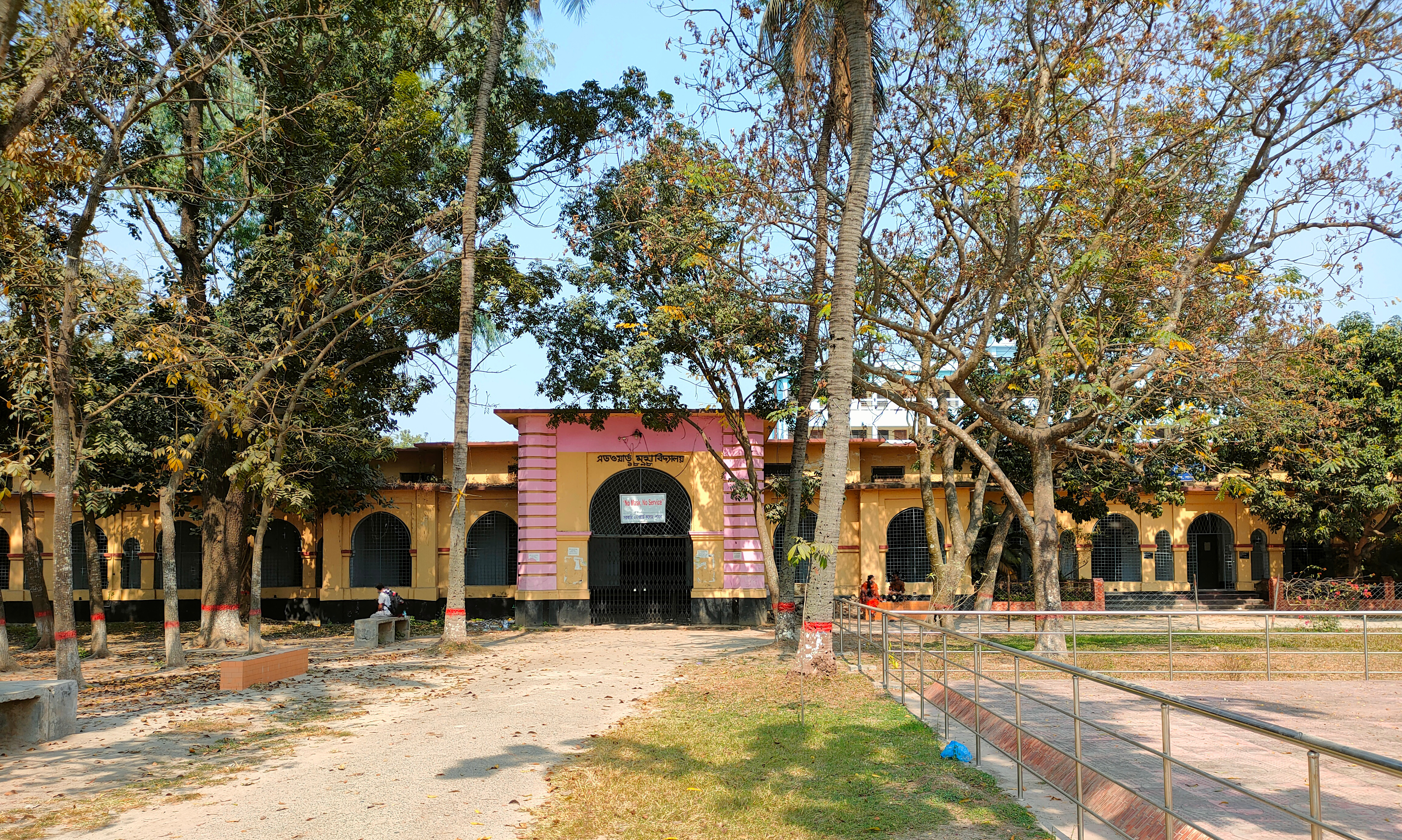
Edward College Old Building

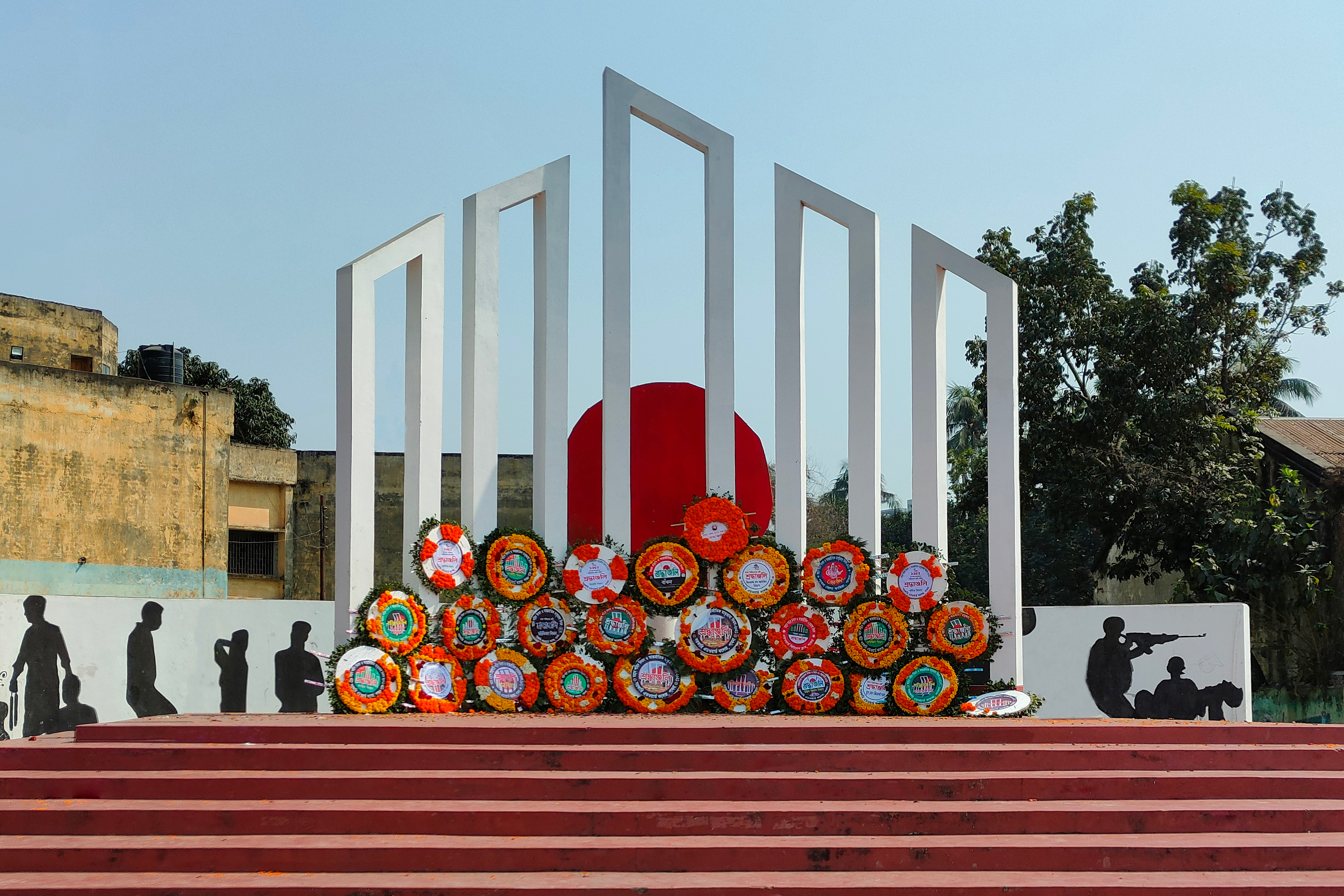
Shaheed Minar Edward College

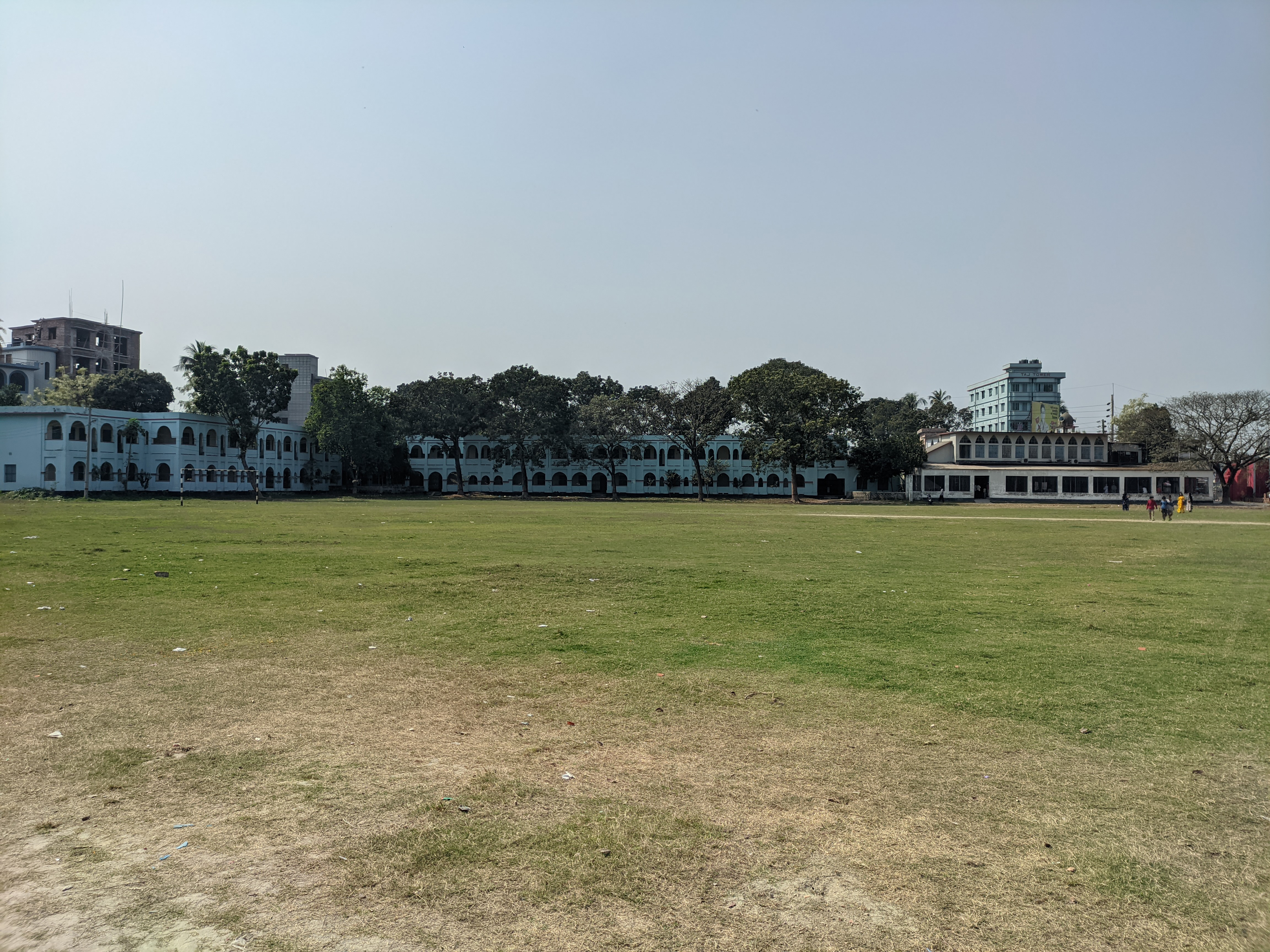
Govt. Edward College, Pabna Playground

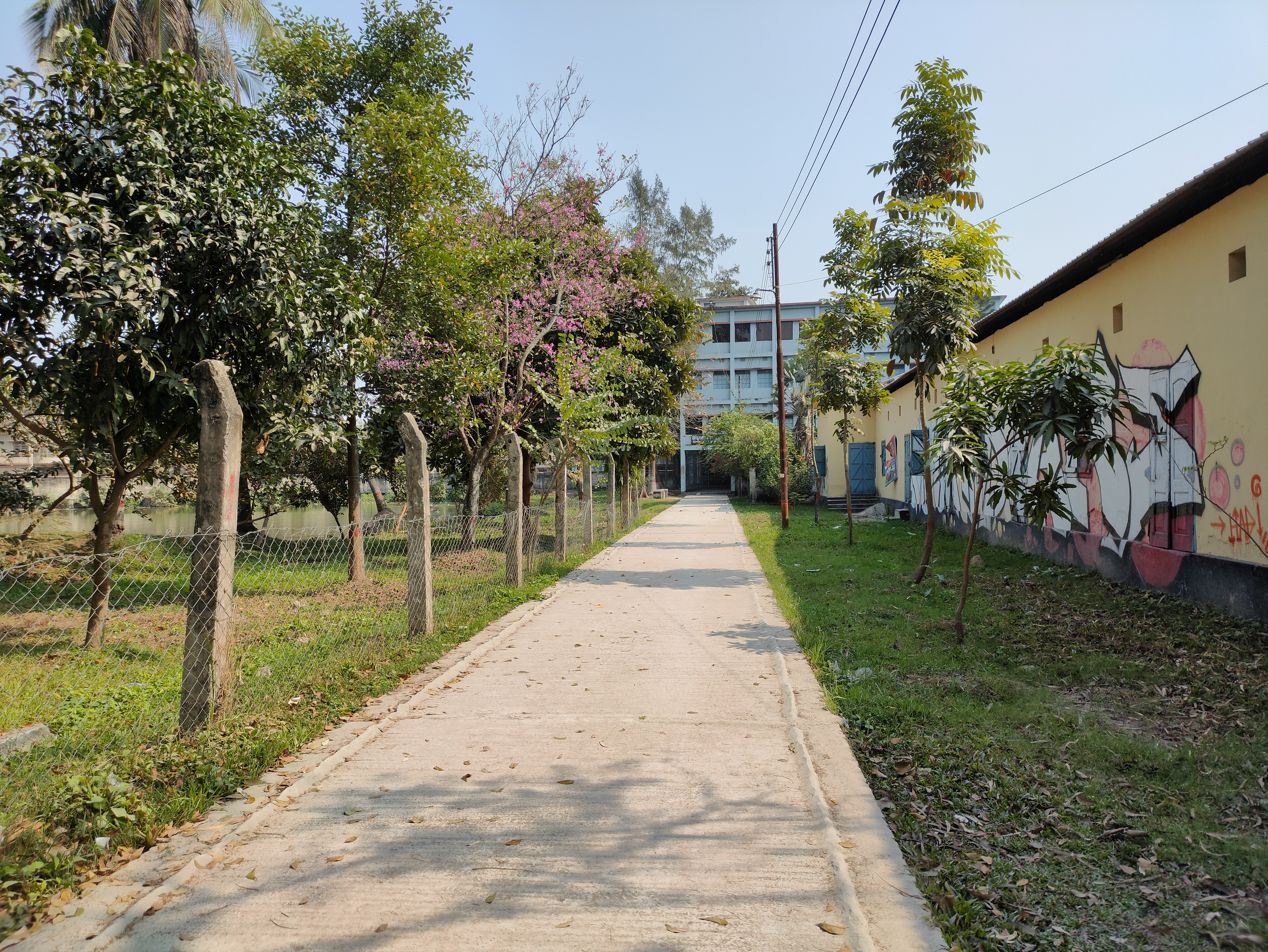
Botany Department Edward College

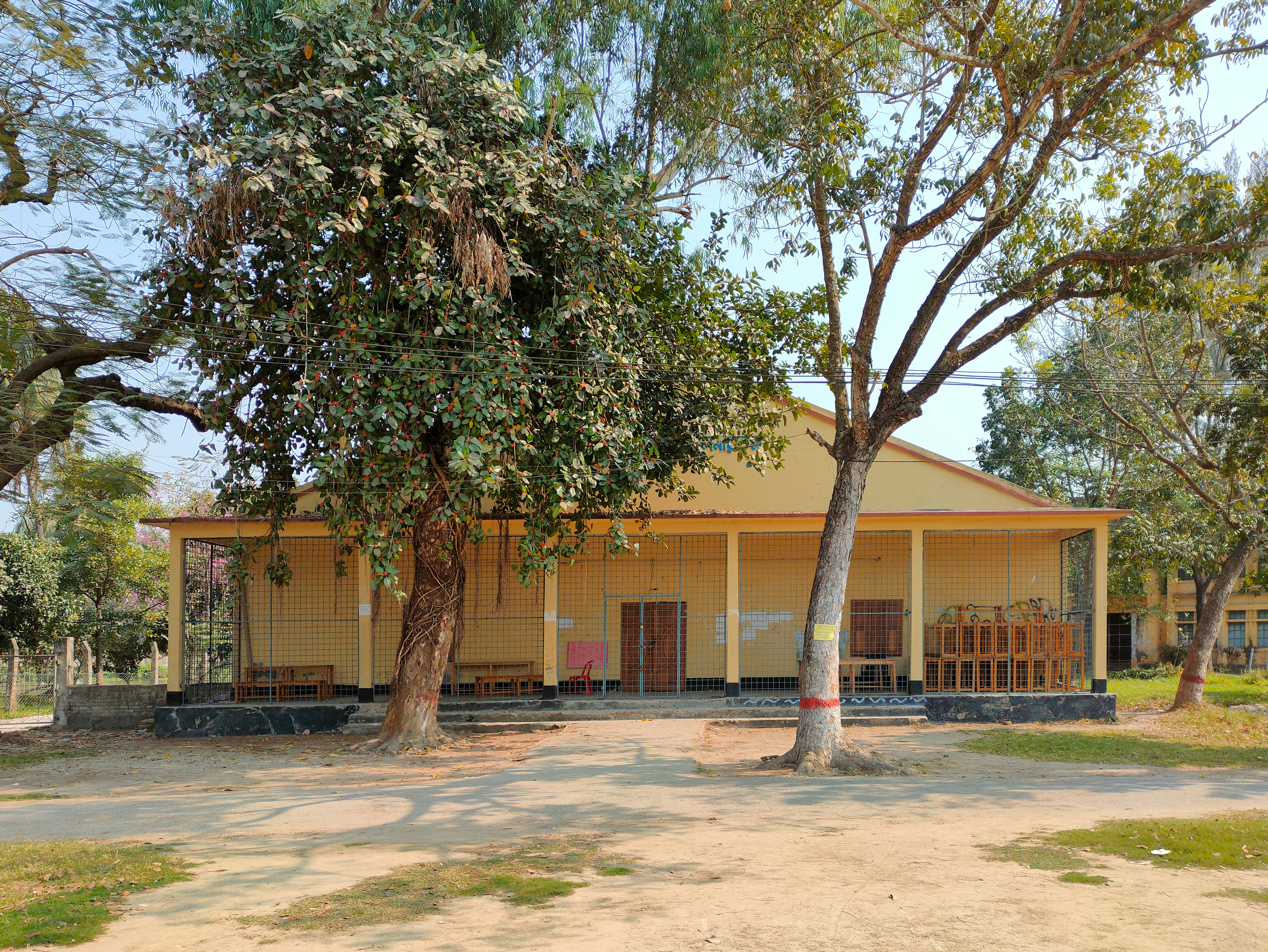
Abdus Sattar Auditorium Edward College

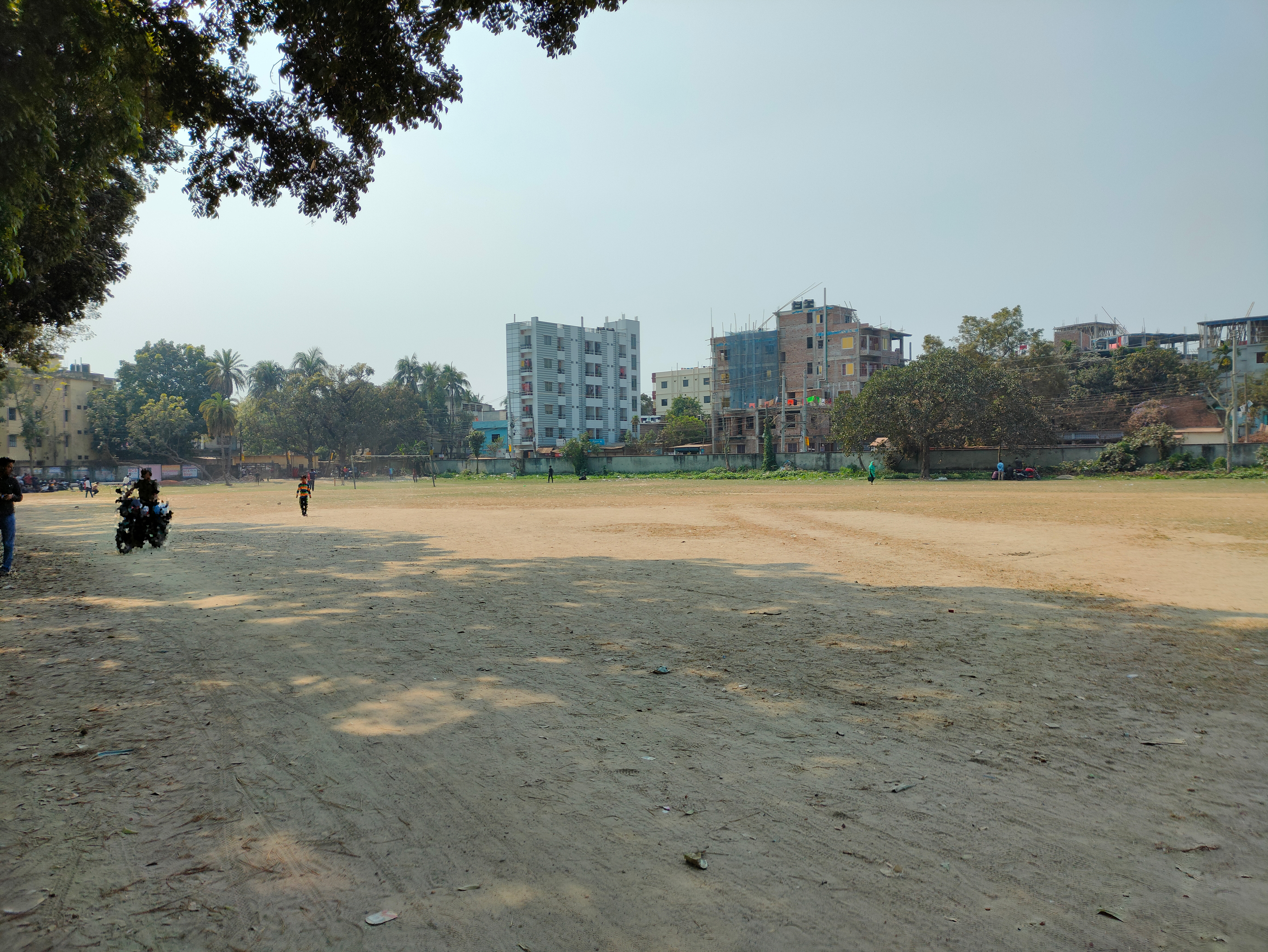
Kamal Uddin Hall Playground

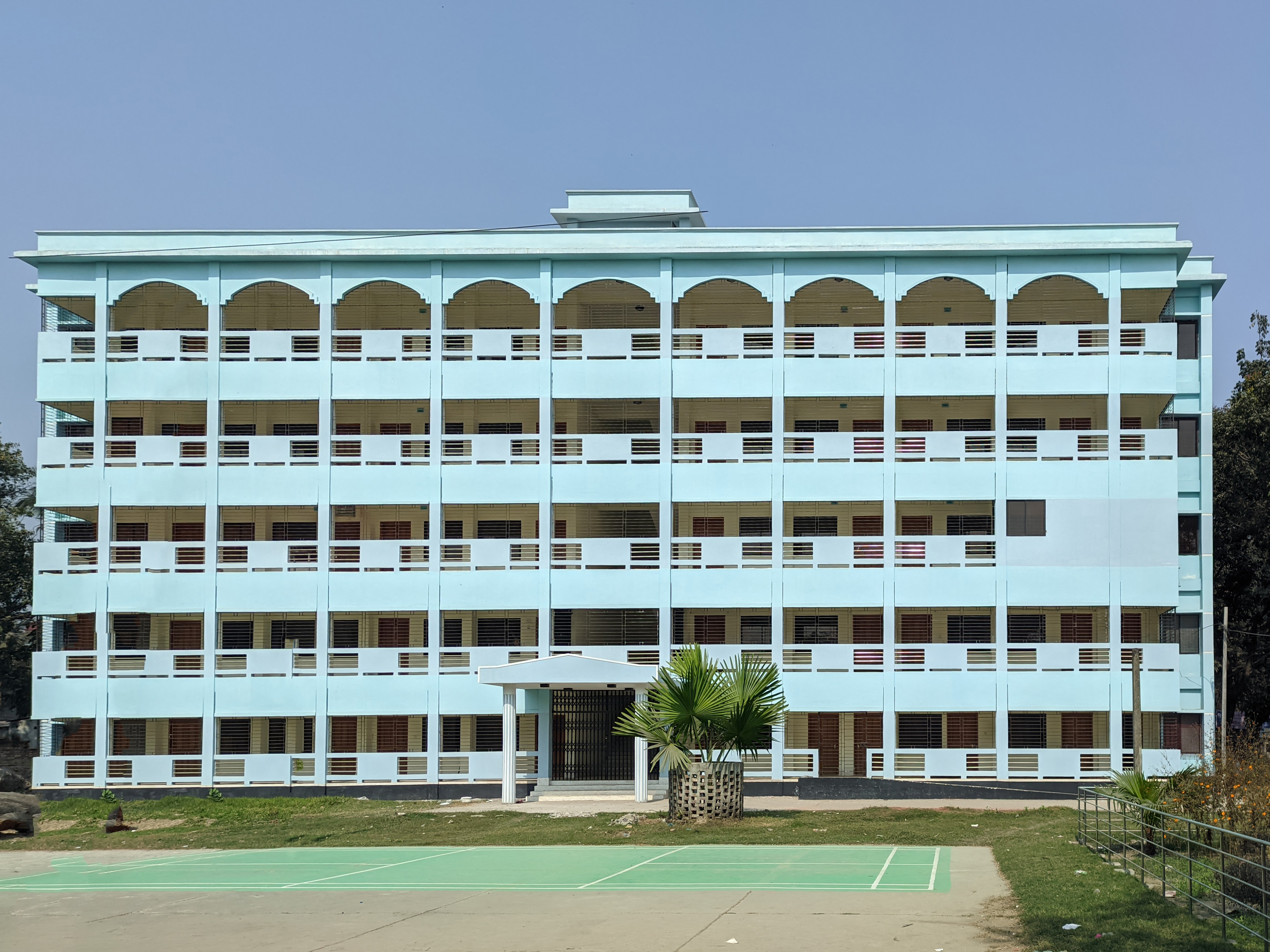
New administration and Principles office - Govt Edward College
