= Hridaypur =

- Neighbourhood
- Location in West Bengal, India Hridaypur (India)
- Coordinates: 22.7°N 88.45°E
- Country: India
- State: West Bengal
- Division: Presidency
- District: North 24 Parganas

Government
  - Type: Municipality
  - Body: Barasat Municipality
- Elevation: 4 m (13 ft)

Languages
  - Official: Bengali, English
- Time zone: UTC+5:30 (IST)
- PIN: 700127
- Telephone code: +91 33
- Vehicle registration: WB
- Lok Sabha constituency: Barasat
- Vidhan Sabha constituency: Barasat
- Website: north24parganas.nic.in

Hridaypur is a neighbourhood in Barasat of North 24 Parganas district in the Indian state of West Bengal. It is a part of the area covered by Kolkata Metropolitan Development Authority (KMDA).

== Geography ==
The rail-line bisects the area in 2 zones:

- West Hridaypur
- East Hridaypur

The Eastern part extends to National Highway 12. The western part is larger. West Hridaypur lacks any defined boundary. The western part of Hridaypur also connects to Madhyamgram Sajirhat via Kora Badamtola.

Hridaypur is notable for the Pranavananda Matri Ashram which is an orphanage for girls following the ideals and teachings of Swami Pranavananda, the founder of Bharat Sevashram Sangha. The ashram also houses a school where a large number of children of the local area study.

== Transportation ==
The National Highway 12 (Jessore Road) runs through the east of Hridaypur. There is a bus stop named Hridaypur More, near Dakbungalow More at the point where the Hridaypur Station Road meets the Jessore Road. Hridaypur railway station, which belongs to the Sealdah–Hasnabad–Bangaon–Ranaghat line serves the area.

== Schools in Hridaypur ==
- West Hridaypur Pranavananda Vidya Mandir for Girls (H.S)
- Manabata Sikshayatan High School
- Udayrajpur Hariharpur High School (H.S)
- Udayrajpur Hariharpur Girls' High School (H.S)

== Colleges in Hridaypur ==
- BCDA College of Pharmacy and Technology
- SM's College of Management and Technology
- Sikkim Manipal University

== Healthcare ==
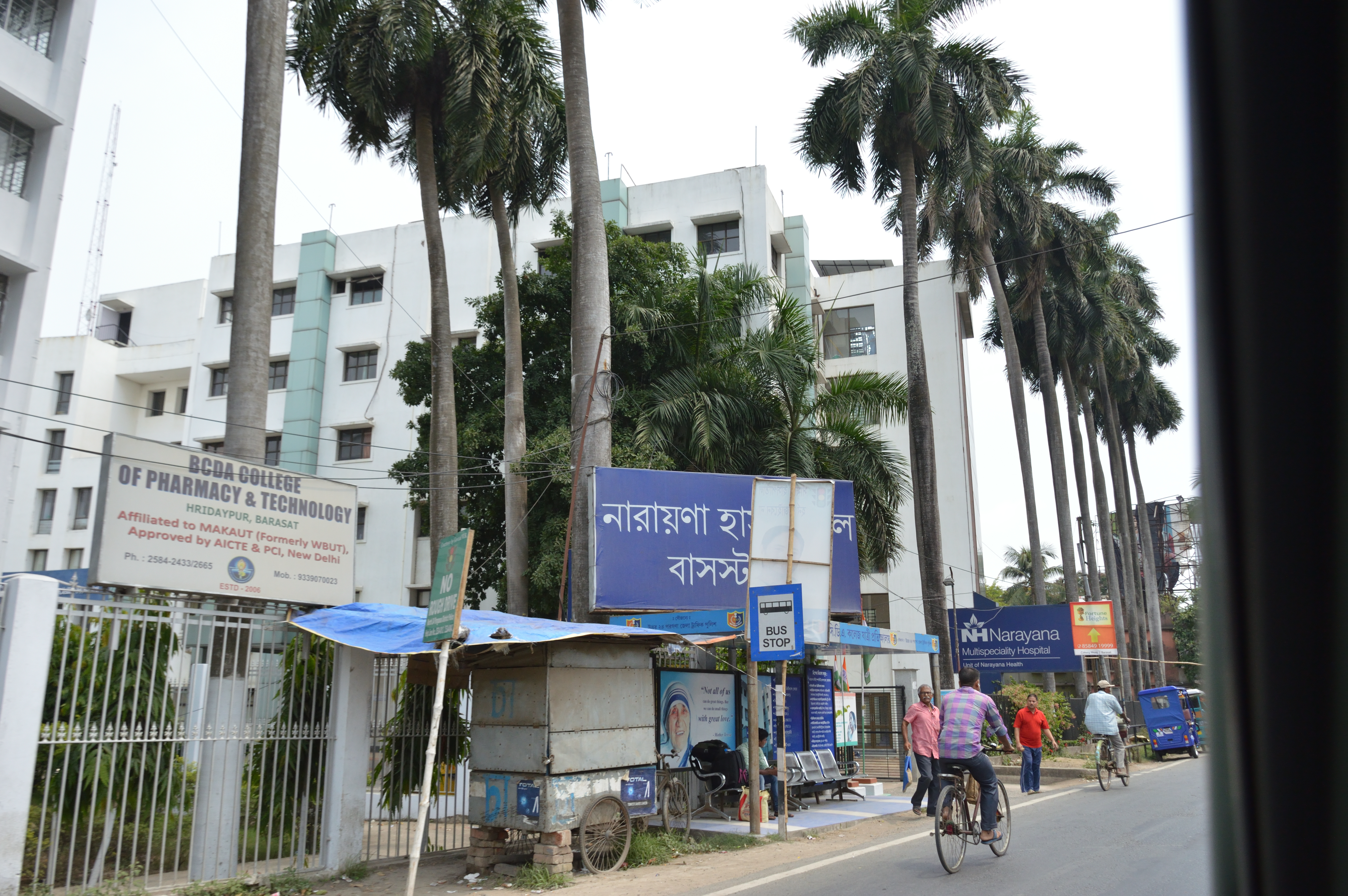
Narayana Multi-specialty Hospital, Hridaypur

1. Narayana Multi-specialty Hospital
2. Renuka Eye Institute
3. Sri Krishna Medical

North 24 Parganas district has been identified as one of the areas where ground water is affected by arsenic contamination.
