= Hridaypur railway station =

Railway station in West Bengal, India

Hridaypur
- Hridaypur Railway Station

General information
- Location: Hridaypur, North 24 Parganas, West Bengal, India
- Coordinates: 22.710679°N 88.469631°E
- Elevation: 11.17 metres (36.6 ft)
- System: Kolkata Suburban Railway station
- Owner: Indian Railways
- Operator: Indian Railways
- Platforms: 2
- Tracks: 2

Construction
- Structure type: At Ground
- Parking: Not available

Other information
- Status: Active
- Station code: HHR
- Zone(s): Eastern Railway
- Division(s): Sealdah

History
- Opened: 1906; 120 years ago
- Electrified: 1972; 54 years ago

Services
Preceding station	Kolkata Suburban Railway	Following station
Madhyamgram towards Sealdah	Eastern Line Sealdah–Bangaon section	Barasat Junction towards Bangaon Junction
Route map
Location
- Location within West Bengal Location within India

Hridaypur is a Kolkata Suburban Railway station in Hridaypur. It serves the Barasat's areas of Dakbunglow, Rathtala, Purbachal, Shishirkunja, Udayrajpur and Chandigarh in the North 24 Parganas district, West Bengal, India. It is under the jurisdiction of Eastern Railway.

== History ==
In 1862, the main line of the Eastern Bengal Railway from Sealdah to Ranaghat was opened and also extended to Kushtia, now in Bangladesh. In 1882–84 the Bengal Central Railway Company constructed two lines: one from Dum Dum to Khulna, now in Bangladesh, via Bangaon and the other linking Ranaghat and Bangaon. The Hridaypur railway station lies in the Dum Dum–Bangaon section and was opened in 1906.

Initially it was just one platform only. Then the second one was built, followed by two passengers shades on both sides, but no overbridge until a few years later.

In early days, the station had a small adjoining "bazaar" next to the Platform 1. Presently, a dense market is located there.

== Electrification ==
The Sealdah–Hasnabad–Bangaon–Ranaghat line was electrified in the year 1972.

== Station complex ==
The present structure is mid-sized, with four entrances, two in each platform. The computerised ticket counter is present in platform no. 1. All the Sealdah and Dum Dum-bound trains arrive at platform no.1 and all the Bangaon, Gobardanga, Thakurnagar, Habra, Duttapukur, Basirhat and Hasnabad bound trains arrive at platform no. 2. A few Hasnabad bound trains are galloping. A foot overbridge connects the two platforms. A level crossing exists at the southernmost end of the railway station.

=== Station layout ===
G	Street level	Exit/Entrance
P1	Side platform No- 1, doors will open on the left
P1		Towards →Sealdah→ →
P1		Towards ←Bangaon← ←
P1	Side platform No- 2, doors will open on the left
P2

== Metro rail connection ==
=== Extension plan from Noapara to Barasat ===
The proposed Kolkata Metro Yellow Line extension alignment pass through Dum Dum Cantonment and Jessore Road up to Biman Bandar station. From there, the line would run under Jessore Road until New Barrackpore before reaching the surface at Madhyamgram station. From Madhyamgram to Barasat, the alignment would be elevated. However, for crossing the existing Road Over Bridge at Madhyamgram and Barasat, the alignment would descend gradually to ground level and rise again on viaduct. This is supposed to be beneficial for the people of North 24 Parganas district and will bring them closer to Kolkata's Business district. This would reduce the heavy pressure on Sealdah–Barasat section of Eastern Railways. The Madhyamgram Metro railway station is to be constructed in the Madhyamgram-Barasat section.

Work for the Noapara–Barasat (via NSC Bose Airport) metro extension has come to a halt as construction giant L&T has pulled out of the 20 km metro corridor project. L&T was unable to get on with the work due to the encroachment on railway land. The company has moved out all major equipment from the project site at Barasat and has closed down two of the three site offices.

== Gallery ==
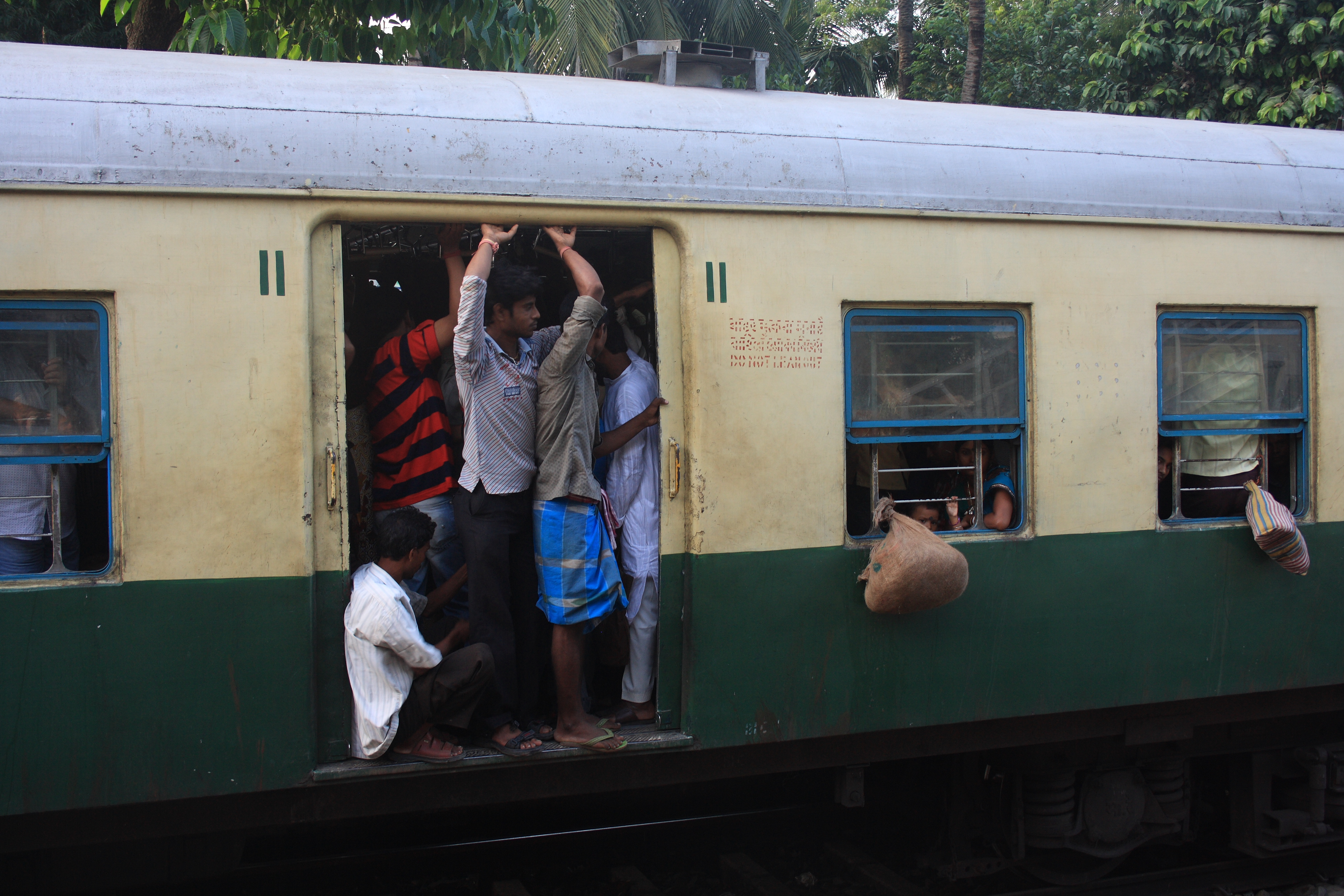
Passengers on a Kolkata local train at Hridaypur station en route from Barasat Junction.

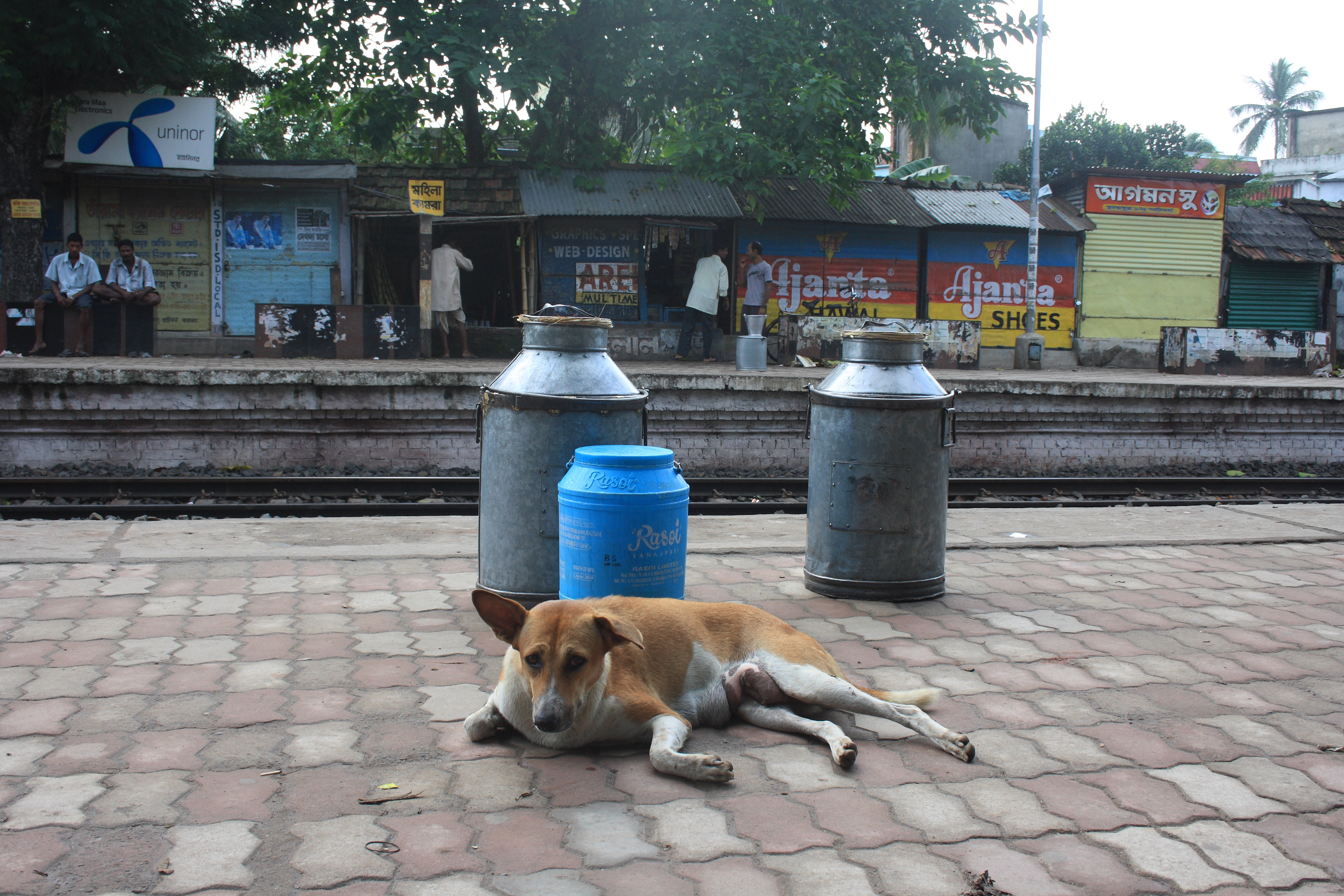
A dog and some milk churns on the platform of Hridaypur local train station in Kolkata.

== See also ==
- North 24 Parganas district
- Indian Railways
- Sealdah railway station
- Sealdah–Hasnabad–Bangaon–Ranaghat line
- Bangaon Junction railway station
- Transport in West Bengal
- List of railway stations in India
