= Tanuma =

Tanuma (written: 田沼. lit "rice field swamp") is a Japanese surname. Notable people with the surname include:

- Hiroyuki Tanuma (田沼 広之, born 1973), Japanese rugby union player
- Tanuma Okitsugu (田沼 意次, 1719–1788), Japanese rōjū and daimyō
- Takeyoshi Tanuma (田沼 武能, born 1929), Japanese photographer

== See also ==
- Tanuma Station, a railway station in Sano, Tochigi Prefecture, Japan
- Tanuma, Tochigi, former town in Aso District, Tochigi Prefecture, Japan
