= Belkuchi Bahumukhi Womens College =

Women's college in Bangladesh

Belkuchi Bohumukhi Mohila College
- Other names: Mohila College
- Type: Private College
- Established: 2000
- Academic affiliations: National University, Bangladesh & Board of Intermediate and Secondary Education, Rajshahi
- Principal: A. K. M. Samsul Alom
- Location: Sirajganj-Enayetpur Road, Belkuchi, Sirajganj, Bangladesh; 24.2866°N 89.6976°E
- Campus: Urban
- Website: www.bbwdc.edu.bd

Belkuchi Bohumukhi Mohila College is a largest women's college of Belkuchi, Sirajgonj.

== History ==
Former minister Latif Biswas founder of Belkuchi Multipurpose Women's College. This college is the only institution for the women of The Belkuchi upazila. There are classes in classes XI - XII. And here various disciplines in degrees. It is about 5 meters from the Belkuchi bus strip. It is located next to the Al-Aman Bahela Khatun Mosque.

== Category summary ==
Higher Secondary Level

- Science branch
- Humanities branch
- Business Education Branch

Degree level

- B.A. (Pass)
- BSS (Pass)
- BBS (pass)
- B.Sc. (Pass)
