= Md. Aynul Haque =

Bangladeshi politician

- মোঃ আয়নুল হক

Member of the Bangladesh Parliament for Sirajganj-3
- Incumbent
- Assumed office 17 February 2026
- Preceded by: Abdul Aziz

Personal details
- Born: September 12, 1968 (age 58) Raiganj Upazila, Sirajganj District
- Party: Bangladesh Nationalist Party

Md. Aynul Haque is a Bangladeshi politician of the Bangladesh Nationalist Party. He is currently serving as a member of parliament from Sirajganj-1.

== Early life ==
Haque was born on 12 September 1968 in Raiganj Upazila in Sirajganj District.
