= Abdul Momin Mondol =

Bangladeshi politician

Member of the Bangladesh Parliament for Sirajganj-5
- In office 30 January 2019 – 6 August 2024
- Preceded by: Abdul Majid Mondol
- Succeeded by: Amirul Islam Khan Alim

Personal details
- Born: 1 January 1980 (age 46) Rupnai, Sirajganj, Bangladesh
- Party: Bangladesh Awami League

Abdul Momin Mondol is a Bangladeshi politician and a former member of parliament for Sirajganj-5.

== Early life ==
Momin Mondol was born on 1 January 1980. He has a B.B.A. degree. His father, Abdul Majid Mondol, was the member of parliament from Sirajganj-5 from 2014 to 2018.

== Career ==
Momin Mondol was elected to parliament from Sirajganj-5 as a Bangladesh Awami League candidate on 30 December 2018.
