= Sirajganj-5 =

Constituency of Bangladesh's Jatiya Sangsad

Coordinates: 24.30°N 89.70°E

- Constituency for the Jatiya Sangsad
- District: Sirajganj District
- Division: Rajshahi Division
- Electorate: 339,906 (2018)

Current constituency
- Created: 1984
- Party: Bangladesh Nationalist Party
- Member: Amirul Islam Khan Alim
- ← 65 Sirajganj-4 67 Sirajganj-6 →

Sirajganj-5 is a constituency represented in the Jatiya Sangsad (National Parliament) of Bangladesh since 2026 by Amirul Islam Khan Alim of the Bangladesh Nationalist Party.

== Boundaries ==
The constituency encompasses Belkuchi and Chauhali upazilas.

== History ==
The constituency was created in 1984 from the Pabna-5 constituency when the former Pabna District was split into two districts: Sirajganj and Pabna.

Ahead of the 2008 general election, the Election Commission redrew constituency boundaries to reflect population changes revealed by the 2001 Bangladesh census. The 2008 redistricting altered the boundaries of the constituency.

== Members of Parliament ==
Election	Member	Party
1986	Mofiz Uddin Talukder	Jatiya Party
1988	Shahidul Islam Khan	Jatiya Party
1991	Shahidullah Khan	Bangladesh Nationalist Party
1996	Abdul Latif Biswas	Awami League
2001	Mozammel Haque	Bangladesh Nationalist Party
2008	Abdul Latif Biswas	Awami League
2014	Abdul Majid Mandal	Awami League
2026	Amirul Islam Khan Alim	Bangladesh Nationalist Party

== Elections ==
=== Elections in the 2010s ===
General Election 2014: Sirajganj-5
Party	Candidate	Votes	%	±%
AL	Abdul Majid Mandal	92,737	93.4	+44.0
Independent	Md. Ataur Rahman	4,248	4.3	N/A
JP(E)	Md. Abu Bakar Siddiqee	2,043	2.1	N/A
Jatiya Party (M)	Abul Hasnat Gofran	227	0.2	N/A
Majority		88,489	89.2	+89.1
Turnout		99,255	32.7	−56.3
AL hold				

=== Elections in the 2000s ===
General Election 2008: Sirajganj-5
Party	Candidate	Votes	%	±%
AL	Muhammad Abdul Latif Biswas	119,582	49.4	+19.1
BNP	Manjur Quader	119,330	49.3	−16.2
IAB	Abdul Mannan	2,725	1.1	N/A
KSJL	Hassan Ali Talukder	432	0.2	N/A
Majority		252	0.1	−35.0
Turnout		242,069	89.0	+22.5
AL gain from BNP				

General Election 2001: Sirajganj-5
Party	Candidate	Votes	%	±%
BNP	Mozammel Haque	118,342	65.5	+31.1
AL	Muhammad Abdul Latif Biswas	54,830	30.3	−6.4
IJOF	Monzur-a-Matin	5,717	3.2	N/A
CPB	Md. Manjur-a-Khoda	1,323	0.7	N/A
JSD	Gazi Atikur Rahman Baki	280	0.2	N/A
Independent	Md. Emdadul Haq	202	0.1	N/A
Independent	Enamul Haque	115	0.1	N/A
Majority		63,512	35.1	+32.7
Turnout		180,809	66.5	−8.8
BNP gain from AL				

=== Elections in the 1990s ===
General Election June 1996: Sirajganj-5
Party	Candidate	Votes	%	±%
AL	Muhammad Abdul Latif Biswas	51,681	36.7	N/A
BNP	Shahidullah Khan	48,360	34.4	+0.5
Jamaat	Ali Alam	23,815	16.9	−10.6
JP(E)	Omor Faruk	16,301	11.6	+8.3
Islamic Sashantantrik Andolan	Md. Nur Hossain	233	0.2	N/A
Zaker Party	Md. Golam Mostofa	210	0.2	−0.3
Independent	Abdul Hasnat Gofran	95	0.1	N/A
Majority		3,321	2.4	−4.0
Turnout		140,695	75.3	−22.8
AL gain from BNP				

General Election 1991: Sirajganj-5
Party	Candidate	Votes	%	±%
BNP	Shahidullah Khan	39,091	33.9	
Jamaat	Ali Alam	31,729	27.5	
BAKSAL	Abdul Momin Talukdar	29,342	25.5	
Bangladesh Muslim League (Matin)	M. A. Matin	9,678	8.4	
JP(E)	Shahidul Islam Khan	3,755	3.3	
Zaker Party	Idris Ali	559	0.5	
Independent	Mofiz Uddin	384	0.3	
BKA	Abdul Mannan	377	0.3	
Jatiya Samajtantrik Dal-JSD	Sanwar	200	0.2	
Independent	Anwar Hossain Rotu	103	0.1	
Majority		7,362	6.4	
Turnout		115,218	52.5	
BNP gain from JP(E)				
