= Chowbari =

Village in Rajshahi, Bangladesh

Coordinates: 24.3194°N 89.6493°E

Chowbari is a village of Kamarkhanda Upazila of Sirajganj District in the Division of Rajshahi, Bangladesh. It stands on the river Hura-shagar. Many of the villagers are service-holders and have migrated to towns for that. There are a number of educational institutions here.
