= Amirul Islam Khan Alim =

Bangladeshi politician

- আমিরুল ইসলাম খান আলীম

Member of the Bangladesh Parliament for Sirajganj-5
- Incumbent
- Assumed office 17 February 2026
- Preceded by: Abdul Majid Mandal

Personal details
- Born: 1 December 1970 (age 55) Tamai, Belkuchi Upazila, Sirajganj District
- Party: Bangladesh Nationalist Party
- Occupation: Politician

Amirul Islam Khan (born 1 December 1970) is a Bangladeshi politician and member of parliament. He was elected as a member of parliament from Sirajganj-5 constituency as a Bangladesh Nationalist Party candidate in the 13th National Parliament election. He is the former co-propaganda secretary of the Central Executive Committee of the Bangladesh Nationalist Party.

== Birth and education ==
He was born on 1 December 1970 in Tamai village of Belkuchi Upazila of Sirajganj District. His father Mozammel Haque Khan was a small businessman and his mother Mosha Angura Begum was a housewife. He passed his SSC examination from Harinarayanpur Multilateral High School in 1986. After completing his HSC from Government Titumir College, he joined the University of Dhaka in 1991 and obtained his bachelor's and master's degrees from the university's Department of Sociology.

== Political career ==
He began his political activities while studying at Titumir College. He joined the politics of Bangladesh Nationalist Chhatra Dal and at one point served as the general secretary of the government Titumir College branch.

He actively participated in the anti-dictatorship movement in the 1990s. Later, he was the general secretary and president of Dhaka University Bangladesh Nationalist Chhatra Dal from 2002 to 2005. In 2009, he served as the general secretary of the central committee of Bangladesh Nationalist Chhatra Dal.

He was then elected as the co-promotion secretary of the central executive committee of Bangladesh Nationalist Dal (BNP). He also served as the co-organizing secretary of Rajshahi Divisional BNP and the convener of the Sirajganj District Conference Preparation Committee. He was elected as a member of parliament for the first time from Sirajganj-05 constituency in the thirteenth national parliamentary election held in 2026.
