= Randhunibari =

Village in Bangladesh

Coordinates: 24°22′26″N 89°43′13″E

Randhunibari (Postal Code - 6742) is a village of Belkuchi Upazila, Sirajganj District, Bangladesh. The village is situated at alongside of the Jamuna, the longest river of the country. Generally, the people of this village handle their own business and the leading business is all about textile. There are two big mosques, some maktabs, a cemetery, a primary school, a high school, a bank, and some other organizations.
