= Sirajganj-3 =

Constituency of Bangladesh's Jatiya Sangsad

Coordinates: 24.51°N 89.53°E

- Constituency for the Jatiya Sangsad
- District: Sirajganj District
- Division: Rajshahi Division
- Electorate: 367,549 (2018)

Current constituency
- Created: 1984
- Party: Bangladesh Nationalist Party
- Member: Md. Aynul Haque
- ← 63 Sirajganj-2 65 Sirajganj-4 →

Sirajganj-3 is a constituency represented in the Jatiya Sangsad (National Parliament) of Bangladesh since 2026 by Md. Aynul Haque of the Bangladesh Nationalist Party.

== Boundaries ==
The constituency encompasses Raiganj and Tarash upazilas.

== History ==
The constituency was created in 1984 from a Pabna constituency when the former Pabna District was split into two districts: Sirajganj and Pabna.

== Members of Parliament ==
Election	Member	Party
1986	Ishaque Hossain Talukder	Awami League
1988	Ataur Rahman	Combined Opposition Party
1991	Abdul Mannan Talukder	Bangladesh Nationalist Party
1996	Abdul Mannan Talukder	Bangladesh Nationalist Party
2001	Abdul Mannan Talukder	Bangladesh Nationalist Party
2008	Ishaque Hossain Talukder	Awami League
2014 by-election	Gazi MM Amjad Hossain	Awami League
2018	Abdul Aziz	Awami League
2026	Md. Aynul Haque	Bangladesh Nationalist Party

== Elections ==
=== Elections in the 2010s ===
Ishaque Hossain Talukder died in October 2014. Gazi MM Amjad Hossain of the Awami League was elected unopposed in December after the Election Commission disqualified the only other candidate in the by-election scheduled for later that month.

Ishaque Hossain Talukder was re-elected unopposed in the 2014 general election after opposition parties withdrew their candidacies in a boycott of the election.

=== Elections in the 2000s ===
General Election 2008: Sirajganj-3
Party	Candidate	Votes	%	±%
AL	Ishaque Hossain Talukder	164,752	59.5	+16.7
BNP	Abdul Mannan Talukder	109,525	39.5	−16.6
Zaker Party	Md. Asaduzzaman	1,955	0.7	N/A
Jatiya Samajtantrik Dal-JSD	Mustofa M. Kamal	777	0.3	N/A
Majority		55,227	19.9	+13.9
Turnout		277,009	92.8	+8.4
AL gain from BNP				

General Election 2001: Sirajganj-3
Party	Candidate	Votes	%	±%
BNP	Abdul Mannan Talukder	127,780	56.1	+11.6
AL	Mohammed Nasim	97,609	42.8	+0.3
IJOF	Md. Sarder A. Jalil	1,837	0.8	N/A
CPB	Md. Ismail Hossain	589	0.3	N/A
Independent	Muhammad Salim	127	0.1	N/A
Majority		30,171	6.0	+4.1
Turnout		227,942	84.4	+5.4
BNP hold				

=== Elections in the 1990s ===
General Election June 1996: Sirajganj-3
Party	Candidate	Votes	%	±%
BNP	Abdul Mannan Talukdar	74,192	44.5	+6.4
AL	Ishaque Hossain Talukdar	70,975	42.5	+8.0
Jamaat	A. B. M. Abdus Sattar	17,845	10.7	−10.2
JP(E)	Sarder A. Zabbar	2,357	1.4	N/A
IOJ	Md. Mufti Khalilur Rahman	1,510	0.9	N/A
Majority		3,217	1.9	−1.7
Turnout		166,879	79.0	+20.3
BNP hold				

General Election 1991: Sirajganj-3
Party	Candidate	Votes	%	±%
BNP	Abdul Mannan Talukdar	46,101	38.1	
AL	Ishaque Hossain Talukdar	41,692	34.5	
Jamaat	Matar Rahman Kha	25,234	20.9	
Jatiya Samajtantrik Dal-JSD	Ataur Rahman	5,281	4.4	
Zaker Party	Kazi Shariful Alam	2,369	2.0	
WPB	Ohidul Alam	205	0.2	
Majority		4,409	3.6	
Turnout		120,882	58.7	
BNP gain from				
