= Mozammel Haque (Bangladesh Nationalist Party politician) =

Bangladeshi politician

Member of Bangladesh Parliament

Personal details
- Born: 1 December 1935 Subarnasara, Belkuchi thana, Sirajganj District, British India
- Died: 17 October 2018 (aged 82) Dhaka, Bangladesh
- Party: Bangladesh Nationalist Party

Mozammel Haque was a Bangladesh Nationalist Party politician and member of parliament for Sirajganj-5.

== Career ==
Haque is a former justice. He was elected to parliament from Sirajganj-5 as a Bangladesh Nationalist Party candidate in 2001. He died on 17 October 2018 in Dhaka.
