= Mohammad Najibar Rahman =

Sahityaratna Mohammad Najibar Rahman
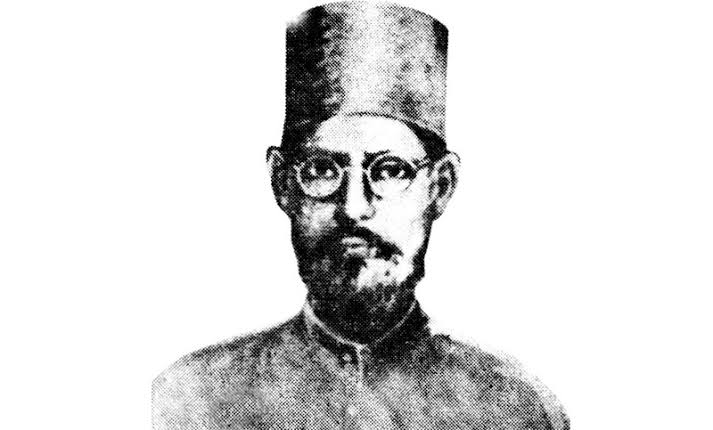
- Native name: মোহাম্মদ নজিবর রহমান
- Born: 1860 Shahzadpur, Pabna District, Bengal Presidency
- Died: 18 October 1923 (aged 62–63) Hati Qumrul, Sirajganj subdivision
- Language: Bengali

Mohammad Najibar Rahman (Bengali: মোহাম্মদ নজিবর রহমান; 1860 – 18 October 1923) was a Bengali writer of fiction from the nineteenth century. He gained great popularity as a novelist during his times and was honored with the title "Sahityaratna" (Literary Jewel). He is considered as a representative of Bengali Muslim writers of the era and is most known for his novel Anwara (1914).

== Early life ==
Rahman was born in 1860 to a Bengali Muslim family in the village of Charbeltail in Shahzadpur, Sirajganj, then a part of the Pabna District of the Bengal Presidency. He studied at Normal school in Dhaka.

== Career ==
After school, Rahman worked at a Neel Kuthi (Indigo factory) in Jalpaiguri. He was a postmaster briefly. But, mostly, he served as a teacher all through his life at different schools like Bhangabari Middle English School in Sirajganj, Salanga Minor School, and Rajshahi Junior Madrasa. He was a home-tutor of the young Mahmuda Khatun Siddiqua, who later became a writer and poet.

During Rahman's tenure as a teacher in Salanga, he played a key role in the protest that lead to the withdrawal of the local Hindu Zamindar's ban on eating beef. In 1892, Rahman founded a maktab in his village, which later was converted to a girls' school. He and his wife had to go door to door to get students for their girls school. Inspired by the notion of a free nation during this time, he published his first collection of essays in the book named Bilati Barjan Rahasya (1904). The book was subsequently banned by the British Raj.

Prominent Muslim Bengali author Ismail Hossain Siraji inspired him to get involved in literary activities. He felt the oppression of Bengali Muslims by British Indian administrators in the context of the Partition of Bengal in 1905. On 16 October 1905, the day the Bengal Province was parted, he attended a meeting with other Muslim figures across East Bengal presided by Nawab Khwaja Salimullah in Northbrook Hall where a political front called the Mohammedan Provincial Union was formed.

== Death ==
On 18 October 1923, Rahman died at Hati Qumrul village in Raiganj.

== Literary work ==
Najibar Rahman wrote about 20 novels. His first novel Anwara(1914) made him a well-known author. His novels sketches the lives of rural Muslim families that had little representation in the Bengali literature of the time.

Some of his literary work are listed below.

Novels:

- Anwara (1914)
- Premer Samadhi (1915)
- Chandtara (1917)
- Parinam (1918)
- Gariber Meye (1923)
- Duniya Ar Chaina (1924)
- Meherunnisa (1924)

Essays collections:

- Bilati Barjan Rahasya (1904)
- Sahitya Prasabga (1904).
