= Abdul Latif Biswas =

Abdul Latif Biswas may refer to:

- Abdul Latif Biswas (Pakistani politician), member of the 2nd National Assembly of Pakistan as a representative of East Pakistan
- Abdul Latif Biswas (Bangladeshi politician) (born 1953), Bangladeshi politician, diplomat, and freedom fighter
