= Chandaikona M. L. High School =

Coordinates: 24.5542°N 89.5073°E

- Seal of Chandaikona M. L. High School
- Shirajgonj; Bangladesh

Information
- Type: Secondary School
- Motto: Come Light From Dark
- Established: 1921
- Campus: Chandaikona
- Sports: Soccer, basketball, cricket, volleyball, athletics, table tennis, handball
- Website: Chandaikona ML High School

Chandaikona M. L. High School is a secondary school at Chandaikona, Raiganj Upazila, Sirajganj District, Bangladesh, established in 1921.

The school is recognized by the Board of Intermediate and Secondary Education, Rajshahi. The average graduating class each year has 400 to 600 students. It is a combined school.

The school has a campus with a play-ground for soccer, basketball, cricket, volleyball, badminton and so on. The school basketball court also serves as a multipurpose auditorium.

== Literacy school ==
Beside the general educational system, the school also provides education for underprivileged children, known as the "Literacy School". The classes go into session after the regular classes break. Although the administration is the same for both the schools, the literacy classes and activities are conducted under a different faculty, and has no affiliation with the regular branch of the school. Students of the regular school often volunteer as teachers for the literacy school.

== Selection of students ==
Students are generally chosen for Grade 3 through an admission test. The students who score the highest are admitted in the school. Generally around 165 students from a total of 900-1000 are admitted each year, around fifty-five for each three section.

== Lab facilities ==
Facilities include two computer labs equipped with multimedia projectors, a separate internet lab, two advanced chemistry labs, two physics labs and two biology labs.
