= Role of political parties during Bengali Language Movement =

There were not many political parties at the time of Bengali language movement. The Bengali Language Movement was a political movement in former East Bengal (renamed East Pakistan in 1952) advocating the recognition of the Bengali language as an official language. There was Muslim League, who were at the treasury bench. The movement was mainly supported by Awami League, National Congress and East Pakistan Communist Party.

== National Congress ==
National Congress was the only team at the opposition side of the house during the movement. In both Legislative Assembly and in Constituent Assembly they exposed of the logical position of the language demand. In doing so some of the members were called Indian agents and were harassed by the government. Some leaders were also arrested and one of them was killed inside the jail.

== Awami League ==
The newly born Awami League were active in the movement. Their co-chairman Ataur Rahman Khan became the chairman of the Kendrio Rashtrabhasha Kormoporishod chairman to help the movement. Their leaders were also suffered in custody.

== Communist Party ==
At the pick of Language Movement government blamed it as a sabotage of the communists. According to them, the local communists were "intrigued by the Indian communists". During the whole movement, activities of the communists were questioned in numerous ways. Tamaddun Majlish once asked the communists to put their hands on the movement. They also blamed the communist party saying they are spoiling the movement and also complained they were weak to make any contribution in the movement.

On 1948, renowned Indian communist leader Muzaffar Ahmed visited Dhaka (then known as Dacca) and attended in meeting the Party. There he was asked to support the movement by Tamaddun Majlish and was refused. Muzaffar explained his position by saying he refused to avoid the movement being labeled by the government as an India-supported movement.

In 1952, Communist Party had to stay underground as they were banned by the government. During that time they also lost their organizing power. Their leaders were arrested, often tortured and even killed inside the jail at that time. However the movement of the 1940s followed the mental of the communists. The idea about of giving Bengali equal status with Urdu also first came from the communists. The main student leader of 1948 Mohammad Toaha and in 1952 Abdul Matin were members of the communist Party.
