= Jadav Chandra Chakravarti =

Bengali mathematician (1855-1920)

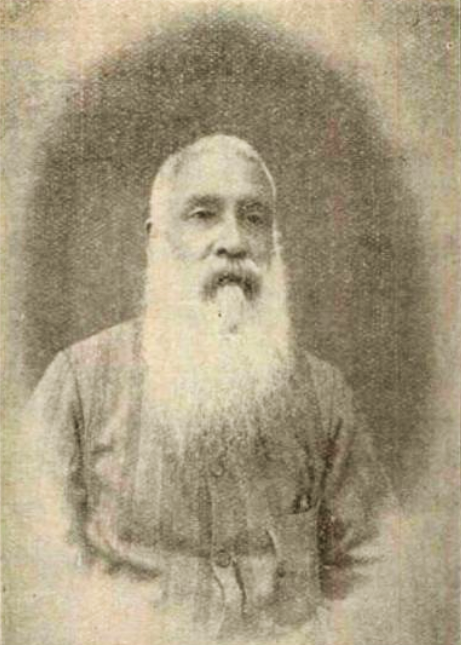
Jadav Chandra Chakravarti

Jadav Chandra Chakravarti (1855 – 26 November 1920) was a prominent Bengali mathematician of the Indian subcontinent. He was famous for his two books named Arithmetic and Algebra.

== Early life ==
Chakravarti was born in 1855 at the village of Tatulia in Kamarkhanda, just few miles from Sirajganj city of the then British Raj (now Bangladesh) to Krishna Chandra Chakravarti and Durga Sundari. He moved to Kolkata for higher education and obtained his M.A. degree in mathematics from Presidency College at the University of Calcutta in 1882. While he was a student of Presidency, he taught physics and chemistry at St. Paul's Cathedral Mission College to pay for his University degree.

== Career ==
Chakravarti started his career as a mathematics teacher at Kolkata City College. Then he joined at Aligarh Muslim College on 1 January 1888 at 200 rupees salary. In 1905, his salary was increased to 300 rupees. One of the famous students of his was Ziauddin Ahmad. He retired from Aligarh College on 28 February 1916.

His first book Arithmetic was published in 1890 and his second book Algebra was published in 1912. His books were translated into a number of languages including Bengali, Urdu, Hindi, Assamese and Nepali.

In 1901, he came back to his home town Sirajganj and founded a school for local children. After his retirement in 1916, he was also elected as the Chairman of Sirajganj Municipality. Before joining to Aligarh Univ. He was a high-level British officer, in the princely state of Cooch Behar. He was instrumental in fixing the match between Maharajah Nripendra Narayan of Cooch Behar and Sunity Devi D/O Sri Keshub Ch. Sen, the founder of the new dispensation. Jadav Babu served cooch behar for some years.

== Death ==
Chakravarti died at the age of 69 on 26 November 1920 at his Kolkata residence.
