= Abdul Majid Mandal =

Bangladeshi politician (1948–2021)

Member of Parliament
- Preceded by: Muhammad Abdul Latif Biswas
- Succeeded by: Abdul Momin Mondol

Personal details
- Born: 9 July 1948
- Died: 22 January 2021 (aged 72)
- Party: Awami League

Abdul Majid Mandal (Bengali: আব্দুল মজিদ মন্ডল) (9 July 1948 – 22 January 2021) was an Awami League politician in Bangladesh who was member of parliament from Sirajganj-5 and Founder of Mondol Group.

== Early life ==
Mandal was born on 9 July 1948.

== Career ==
In November 2013, Mandal was nominated by Bangladesh Awami League to contest the 10th parliamentary elections from Sirajganj. The then incumbent Member of Parliament, Abdul Latif Biswas, lost the nomination to Mandal and this led many of Biswas's supporters in Sirajganj to resign from the Awami League in protest. Mandal became the president of Enayetpur thana unit of the Awami League despite not having any affiliation with the party before 2014.

He was elected to Parliament on 5 January 2014 from Sirajganj-5, representing Belkuchi Upazila and Chauhali Upazila. He was a member of the Parliamentary Committee on the Ministry of Textiles and Jute. He is the founding chairman of Mondol Group.

== Death ==
Mandal died on 22 January 2021. The parliament passed a condolence motion after his death in the 12th parliamentary session. His son, Abdul Momin Mondol, is the member of parliament from his former constituency Sirajganj-5.
