= Ataur Rahman (politician, born 1951) =

Bangladeshi politician

Member of Bangladesh Parliament
- In office 3 March 1988 – 6 December 1990
- Preceded by: Ishaque Hossain Talukder
- Succeeded by: Abdul Mannan Talukder

Personal details
- Died: 21 November 2017 Baidyanathpur, Tarash Upazila, Sirajganj District, Bangladesh
- Party: Jatiya Samajtantrik Dal-JSD

Ataur Rahman was a Jatiya Samajtantrik Dal-JSD politician and member of parliament for Sirajganj-3.

== Career ==
Ataur Rahman was elected to parliament from Sirajganj-3 in 1988. He died on 21 November 2017 in Baidyanathpur, Tarash Upazila, Sirajganj District, Bangladesh.
