= Dawlatpur Degree College =

Private college in Bangladesh

- Other names: DDC
- Type: Private college
- Established: 1996
- Affiliations: National University, Bangladesh and Board of Intermediate and Secondary Education, Rajshahi
- Principal: Masud Rana
- Location: Dawlatpur, Belkuchi, Sirajganj, Bangladesh; 24.2497°N 89.6667°E
- Campus: Urban
- Website: daowlatpurdegreecollege.edu.bd

Dawlatpur Degree College is a private college in Belkuchi Upazila, of Sirajganj District, Bangladesh. The college is affiliated to the Board of Intermediate and Secondary Education, Rajshahi and National University.

== History ==
The college was established by a few locals and after the village where it is located.
