= Amanul Haque (photographer) =

Bangladeshi photographer

- Born: 1925; Shahjadpur Upazila, Sirajganj District, Bengal Presidency, British India
- Died: 3 April 2013 (aged 88); Dhaka, Bangladesh
- Occupation: Photographer

Amanul Haque (c. 1925 – 3 April 2013) was a Bangladeshi photographer. He was awarded Ekushey Padak in 2011 by the Government of Bangladesh.

== Career ==
Haque joined Dhaka Medical College as an artist-photographer. He used to sketch human organs for medical students. During Bengali language movement in 1952, he took photographs of events with his camera which include the photograph of bullet-riddled body of activist Rafiq Uddin Ahmed.

Haque worked with Indian filmmaker Satyajit Ray as still photographer in the film Pather Panchali (1955). He published a photo album titled Prosongo Satyajit which features images of Ray shot by him.

Haque was never married.
