= Abdul Mannan Talukder =

Bangladeshi politician (1936–2025)

- আবদুল মান্নান তালুকদার

Member of Parliament for Sirajganj-3
- In office 5 March 1991 – 27 October 2006
- Preceded by: Ataur Rahman
- Succeeded by: Gazi M M Amjad Hossain

Personal details
- Born: 2 March 1936 Sirajganj, Bengal Presidency, British India
- Died: 18 July 2025 (aged 89) Dhaka, Bangladesh
- Party: Bangladesh Nationalist Party

Abdul Mannan Talukder (Bengali: আবদুল মান্নান তালুকদার; 2 March 1936 – 18 July 2025) was a Bangladesh Nationalist Party politician who was a member of the Jatiya Sangsad, representing the Sirajganj-3 constituency.

== Life and career ==
Talukder was elected to parliament from Sirajganj-3 as a candidate of the Bangladesh Nationalist Party in 1991, February 1996, June 1996, and 2001.

Talukder died in Dhaka on 18 July 2025, at the age of 89.
