= Motahar Hossain Talukdar =

Bangladeshi politician (1922–2001)

- Born: 1922; Gazaria, Ratankandi, Sirajganj, Bengal Presidency, British India. (current Bangladesh)
- Died: 2 December 2001 (aged 78–79); Sirajganj
- Education: Pabna Edward College; Rajshahi College
- Political party: Awami League
- Awards: Ekushey Padak (2021)

Motahar Hossain Talukder (1922–2 December 2001), also known as Motahar Master, was a politician from Sirajganj District of Bangladesh. He was posthumously awarded the Ekushey Padak in 2021 by the Government of Bangladesh for his significant contribution to the Bengali language movement.

== Early life ==
Talukdar was born in 1922 in Gazaria in Ratankandi Union, Sirajganj. His father, Naimuddin Talukder was a teacher. He completed higher secondary from Pabna Edward College and completed BSc from Rajshahi College.

== Career ==
Talukder was the former governor of Sirajganj District during the BAKSAL period. He was defeated in the Sirajganj-2 constituency as a candidate of Awami League in the fifth parliamentary elections of 1991.

Talukdar wrote an essay titled "55 years of my political life".

== Death ==
Talukder died on 2 December 2001 in Sirajganj.
