= Shahidullah Khan =

Bangladeshi politician

Member of Bangladesh Parliament
- In office 1991–1996
- Preceded by: Shahidul Islam Khan
- Succeeded by: Muhammad Abdul Latif Biswas

Personal details
- Party: Bangladesh Nationalist Party

Shahidullah Khan is a Bangladesh Nationalist Party politician and a former member of parliament for Sirajganj-5.

== Career ==
Khan was elected to parliament from Sirajganj-5 as a Bangladesh Nationalist Party candidate in 1991.
