= Gazi M M Amjad Hossain =

Bangladeshi politician (1949–2021)

Member of Parliament for Sirajganj-3
- In office 2014 by-election – 29 December 2018
- Preceded by: Ishaque Hossain Talukder
- Succeeded by: Abdul Aziz

Personal details
- Born: 11 November 1949
- Died: 18 April 2021 (aged 71)
- Party: Bangladesh Awami League

Gazi M M Amjad Hossain (11 November 1949 – 18 April 2021) was a Bangladesh Awami League politician and the incumbent Member of Parliament from Sirajganj-3.

== Early life ==
Hossain was born on 11 November 1949 in Magura Binod, Tarash Upazila, Sirajganj District.

== Career ==
Hossain was elected to Parliament on 5 January 2014 from Sirajganj-3 as a Bangladesh Awami League candidate.

== Death ==
Gazi died on 18 April 2021 at a hospital in Sirajganj District.
