= Abdul Aziz (Sirajganj politician) =

Bangladeshi politician

- আব্দুল আজিজ

Member of the Bangladesh Parliament for Sirajganj-3
- In office 30 January 2019 – 6 August 2024
- Preceded by: Gazi M M Amjad Hossain
- Succeeded by: Md. Aynul Haque

Personal details
- Born: 23 April 1963 (age 63)
- Party: Bangladesh Awami League

Abdul Aziz (born 23 April 1963) is a Bangladesh Awami League politician and a former member of Jatiya Sangsad representing the Sirajganj-3 constituency.

== Career ==
Abdul Aziz was elected to parliament from Sirajganj-3 as a Bangladesh Awami League candidate on 30 December 2018. Aziz was re-elected in 2024.

Following the fall of the Sheikh Hasina-led Awami League government, Aziz was arrested in February 2025 on an attempted murder case filed by the president of the Baruhash Union unit of the Bangladesh Nationalist Party. He was assaulted by Students Against Discrimination activists in April 2025 after being released on bail.
