= Mahmuda Khatun Siddiqua =

Raquibunnesa Mahmuda Khatun Siddiqua
- মাহমুদা খাতুন সিদ্দিকা
- Born: 16 December 1906; Pabna District, Eastern Bengal and Assam
- Died: 2 May 1977 (aged 70); Dhaka, Bangladesh
- Other name: Batashi

Raquibunnesa Mahmuda Khatun Siddiqua (Bengali: রকীবুন্নেসা মাহমুদা খাতুন সিদ্দিকা; 16 December 1906 – 2 May 1977), also known by her daak naam Batashi (Bengali: বাতাসী), was a Bangladeshi poet, essayist, and a pioneering women's liberation activist. She was awarded Ekushey Padak in 1977 by the Government of Bangladesh.

== Life and activism ==
Siddiqua was born on 16 December 1906 in Pabna District, Eastern Bengal and Assam. She belonged to a Bengali Muslim zamindar family from Niamatbari in Kushtia and traced her lineage to Sheikh Saifullah. Her father, Khan Bahadur Mohammad Sulaiman, was employed as the deputy collector of Rajshahi Division and was also a school inspector who supported women's literary movement. Her mother, Syeda Rahatunnesa Khatun, was a bibliophile and hailed from a Syed family.

The young Mahmuda showed great skills in sketching and drawing. She was homeschooled by the author Mohammad Najibar Rahman. Although her father was a proponent of female education, she could only study till Class 8 and was married off at a young age. However, she got a divorce from her husband when her rights and independence were throttled. She returned to live with her father who supporter her independence and social work throughout his life as she wrote poems and joined social welfare activities. She was involved in running a free-clinic for homeopathy treatment and also joined the Swadeshi movement.

Mahmuda believed in the network of sisterhood and supported new female writers whole-hardheartedly. She was inspired by how Saogat supported the women's movement and wrote in the magazine all through. She also mentored new writers with networking leads and advice. Her niece Nurjahan Begum remembers:

She would bring along women writers, whenever she found one. She went knocking at different publishers doors, urging them to publish books by a lot of women writers. Most of them still remember her.

== Literary work ==
Mahmuda's first poem was published in a magazine from Calcutta called Al-Islam when she was twelve. She also attended literary meetings both in Pabna and Calcutta. Although she did not receive any formal degrees, she was a self-taught scholar. She ready widely and was influenced by contemporary literature. She also traveled to many places, which inspired her to write about themes like nature, environment, culture and society.

Mahmuda's compositions included sonnets and poems in free verse. She was deeply moved by the woes caused by the two World Wars and advocated for peace in her poems. She published three volumes of poetry: Pasharini (1931), Man O Mrttika (1960) and Aranyer Sur (1963). Additionally, she also wrote essays and short stories.

== Death ==
She died on 2 May 1977.

== Awards ==
- Bangla Academy Literary Award (1967)
- Ekushey Padak (1977)
