= Belkuchi Government College =

College in Bangladesh

Belkuchi College
- Other name: BC
- Type: Government College
- Established: 1970
- Affiliations: National University, Bangladesh and Board of Intermediate and Secondary Education, Rajshahi
- Principal: Md. Mastafijur Rahman
- Location: Sirajganj - Enaitpur Road, Belkuchi, Sirajganj, Bangladesh; 24.2884°N 89.6991°E
- Campus: Urban
- Website: belkuchicollege.edu.bd

Belkuchi Government College is a government college in Belkuchi, Sirajgonj.

== History ==
In 1970s there was a great tide of inspiration in establishing colleges in different Belkuchi thanas of Sirajganj. A large number of elites of Belkuchi were also present there.

Since the 2010–2011 academic year, the college has been honored with Honor's College by opening political science, accounting management honors courses.

== HSC ==
- Compulsory: Bangla, English & ICT
- Humanities: Economics, Social science, civics and good governance, Islamic History, Psychology, Logic, Islamic studies, History
- Business Studies: Accounting, Business organization and management, Finance, Banking and insurance, Production management and marketing, Statistics
- Science: Physics, Chemistry, Higher mathematics & Biology

== Degree (Pass) ==
- Compulsory: History of the Emergence of Independent Bangladesh, Bangla, English
- BA/BSS: Political Science, Sociology, Islamic History & culture Economics, Philosophy, Islamic studies, Psychology, English
- BBS: Accounting, Management, Marketing, Finance
- B Sc: Physics, Chemistry, Mathematics Zoology & Botany

== Degree (Hons) ==
- Bangla
- Political Science
- Sociology
- Accounting
- Management
