= Mofiz Uddin Talukder =

Bangladeshi politician

Member of Bangladesh Parliament
- In office 1986–1988
- Succeeded by: Shahidul Islam Khan

Personal details
- Party: Independent

Mofiz Uddin Talukder is an independent politician in Bangladesh and a former member of parliament for Sirajganj-5.

== Career ==
Talukder was elected to parliament from Sirajganj-5 as an independent candidate in 1986.
