= Raiganj Upazila =

Raiganj রায়গঞ্জ
- Upazila of Bangladesh
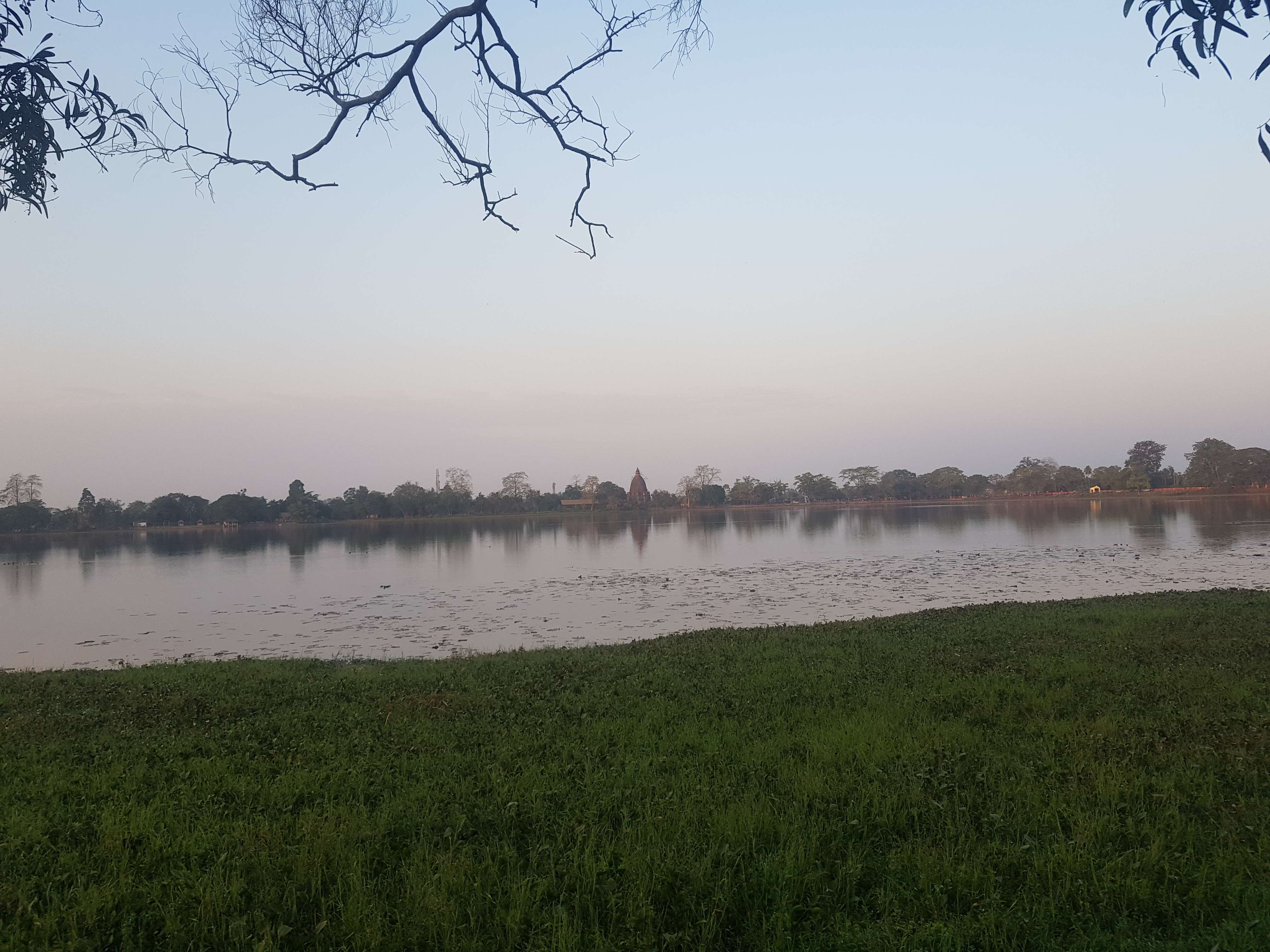
- Joysagar Dighi in 2022

- Location of Sirajganj District in Bangladesh
- Coordinates: 24°30.1′N 89°32.1′E
- Country: Bangladesh
- Division: Rajshahi
- District: Sirajganj

Government
  - Upazila Chairman: Suspended
  - MP (Sirajganj-3): suspended

Area
  - Total: 259.74 km^{2} (100.29 sq mi)

Population (2022)
  - Total: 348,190
  - Density: 1,340.5/km^{2} (3,472.0/sq mi)
- Time zone: UTC+6 (BST)
- Postal code: 6720
- Area code: 07526
- Website: raigonj.sirajganj.gov.bd

Raiganj (Bengali: রায়গঞ্জ) is an upazila, or sub-district, of Sirajganj District, located in Rajshahi Division, Bangladesh.

== Etymology ==
Raiganj is a Bengali language compound of two words; Rai, a title of nobility, and Ganj meaning marketplace/neighborhood. There are numerous theories as to how the area got its name, with the popular theory being that it was named after Shreeman Haridas Guha Rai Thakur, an influential Zamindar in the area. Other historians suggest that the area was named after the Rai Bahadurs of Tarash who founded a marketplace in present-day Raiganj.

== History ==
In the 10th century, this area was a part of the Pala Empire. Emperor Gopala II (r. 940–960) dug a 174 bigha lake known as Jaysagar, located 1 km west of the Nimgachhi Bazar in Sonakhara Union. This lake was famed across North Bengal and served to alleviate the water shortages of the locals and cattle. During the Mughal period, a three-domed mosque was constructed in present-day Dhangara.

On 27 January 1922, hundreds of people were killed in Salanga when the British colonial authorities indiscriminately opened fire on a rally led by Abdur Rashid Tarkabagish as part of the Swadeshi movement. A mass graveyard remains near Salanga Bazar, and the event is annually commemorated on 27 January in Bangladesh as Salanga Day. Raiganj Thana was formed in 1937.

During the Bangladesh Liberation War of 1971, the areas of Chandaikona Bazar, Pangashi, Salanga and Dhangara were plundered and its inhabitants were mass killed with many houses set on fire. Raiganj was liberated on 12 December. Raiganj Thana was turned into an upazila in 1984.

== Geography ==
About 65% of the total land of the upazila belongs to flood-prone areas and the remaining 35% belongs to the Varendra region. Geographical location of Raiganj upazila is between 24'09 and 24'23 north latitude, 89'23 and 89'38 longitude. It is bounded by Sherpur and Dhunat upazilas (Bogura) on the north, Ullahpara and Kamarkhanda on the south, Tarash on the west and Sirajganj Sadar on the east.

== Demographics ==
Religions in Raiganj Upazila (2022)
| Religion | Percent |
| Islam | 89.75% |
| Hinduism | 10.21% |
| Other or not stated | 0.04% |

According to the 2022 Bangladeshi census, Rayganj Upazila had 90,253 households and a population of 348,190. 9.48% of the population were under 5 years of age. Rayganj had a literacy rate (age 7 and over) of 68.57%: 71.20% for males and 66.01% for females, and a sex ratio of 98.08 males for every 100 females. 26,092 (7.49%) lived in urban areas. Ethnic population is 9,088 (2.61%), of which 5,728 are Mahato, 1,117 Oraon.

Population of Raiganj upazila by ethnicity (2022)
1. Bengali (97.4%)
2. Mahato (1.65%)
3. Others (0.96%)

According to the 2011 Census of Bangladesh, Raiganj Upazila had 77,198 households and a population of 317,666. 75,678 (23.82%) were under 10 years of age. Raiganj had a literacy rate (age 7 and over) of 38.14%, compared to the national average of 51.8%, and a sex ratio of 1003 females per 1000 males. 18,890 (5.95%) lived in urban areas. Ethnic population was 9,664 (3.04%), the majority of whom were Mahato and Oraon.

As of the 1991 Bangladesh census, Raiganj has a population of 225028. Males constitute 50.91% of the population, and females 49.09%. This Upazila's eighteen up population is 112175. Raiganj has an average literacy rate of 21.8% (7+ years), and the national average of 32.4% literate.

== Economy and tourism ==
Raiganj Upazila has many relics and a strong archaeological heritage. Home to over 360 mosques, some notable ones include the Kharija Ghughat Mosque and Majumbarir Masjid. Majumbarir Masjid is a three-domed mosque in Dhangara dating back to the Mughal period. It is in a forested abandoned condition. The mazar of Bhola Dewan and the Birat Raja Palace in Nimgachhi are also popular attractions. The 174 bigha 10th-century Jaysagar reservoir is famed across North Bengal and is 1 km west of the Nimgachhi Bazar in Sonakhara Union.

Main sources of income: Agriculture 69.27%, non-agricultural laborer 2.93%, industry 4.46%, commerce 11.25%, transport and communication 2.51%, service 3.90%, construction 0.90%, religious service 0.17%, rent and remittance 0.18% and others 5.33%

Ownership of agricultural land: Landowner 55.99%, landless 44.01%; agricultural landowner: urban 35.59% and rural 56.49%.

Main crops: Paddy, jute, potato, sugarcane, wheat, pulse, vegetables and fruits Mango, jack-fruit, litchi, banana, papaya, guava, blackberry.

Fisheries, dairies and poultices: Fishery 38, dairy 8, poultry 28, hatchery 5.

There are also many factories like rice mill, flour mill, ice factory, saw mill, welding factory.

== Administration ==
Raiganj Upazila is divided into Raiganj Municipality and nine union parishads: Brommogacha, Chandaikona, Dhamainagar, Dhangara, Dhubil, Ghurka, Nalka, Pangashi, and Sonakhara. The union parishads are subdivided into 187 mauzas and 267 villages.

Raiganj Municipality is subdivided into 9 wards and 29 mahallas.

== Education ==
There are nine colleges in the upazila: Begum Nurnnahar Tarkabagish Honurs College, Dadpur G.R. College, Fuljore Degree College, Gram Pangashi College, Hazi Wahed Maryam Degree College, Nimgachi Degree College, Raiganj Upazila Sadar Dhangara Mohila College, Salanga Degree College, and Salanga Women's College.

According to Banglapedia, Chandaikona M. L. High School, founded in 1921, Dhangara High School (1950), Charpara High School(1995) and J. K. A. Mannan High School (1973) are notable secondary schools. In 1976, the Dhangara Fazil Madrasa was established.

== See also ==
- Upazilas of Bangladesh
- Districts of Bangladesh
- Divisions of Bangladesh
