= Abdul Matin (language activist) =

Bengali language activist and communist (1926–2014)

- আব্দুল মতিন
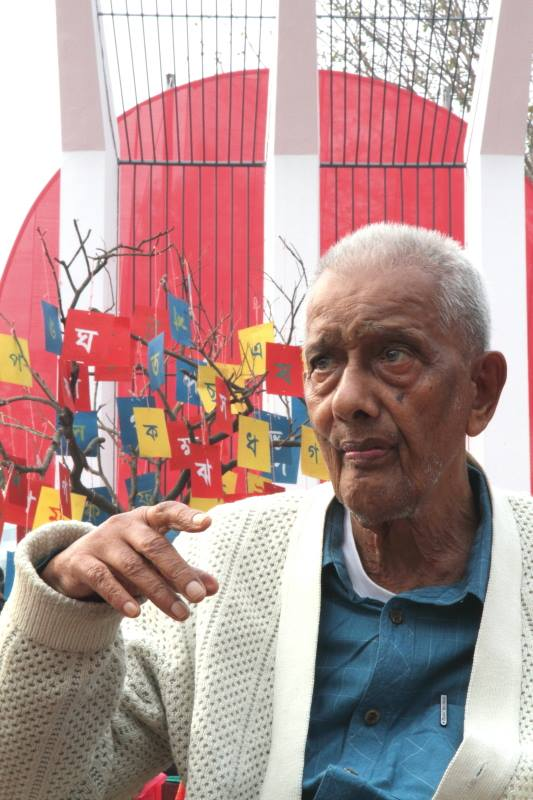
- Born: 3 December 1926; Dubalia, Sirajganj District, Bengal Presidency
- Died: 8 October 2014 (aged 87); Dhaka, Bangladesh
- Other name: Bhasha Matin
- Education: Master of Arts from University of Dhaka
- Political party: United Communist League of Bangladesh
- Other political affiliations: Workers Party of Bangladesh (reconstituted); Communist Party of Bangladesh (Marxist–Leninist); Communist Party of Bangladesh; National Awami Party
- Movement: Bengali language movement
- Children: Matia Banu Shuku
- Awards: Independence Day Award

Abdul Matin (Bengali: আবদুল মতিন; 3 December 1926 – 8 October 2014) was a communist, language activist, and student leader of the Bengali language movement that took place in East Pakistan (now Bangladesh) which sought recognition of Bengali as one of the state languages of Pakistan. He was one of the organizers of the movement. His contribution to the movement has been hailed by the other activists and students, as he was popularly known as Bhasha Matin.

== Early life ==
Matin was born on 3 December 1926 to Bengali Muslim parents, Abdul Jalil and Amena Khatun, in the village of Dubalia in Sirajganj, then part of Pabna District in the Bengal Presidency. Due to the Jamuna River floods, their home was destroyed, and the family resettled in Darjeeling. Matin was admitted to Maharani Boys' High School. He then enrolled at the Darjeeling Government High School in 1932 and completed his entrance exam in 1943. He then joined Rajshahi College, where he passed his Intermediate of Arts in 1945. He graduated with a Bachelor of Arts from the University of Dacca in 1947 and subsequently completed a Master of Arts in international relations. According to him, he had no political consciousness before getting into the college.

== Involvement in Language Movement ==
Matin was an active participant in the Bengali Language Movement. On 11 March 1948, he joined student protests against the government's decision not to recognize Bengali as one of the state languages. On 24 March 1948, he attended the convocation ceremony at the University of Dhaka, where Mohammad Ali Jinnah repeated his position on language policy following his speech at Race Course Maidan (now Suhrawardy Udyan). Matin was also present at the ceremony to receive his degree. When Jinnah repeated his position about language policy, however, Matin stood up at the chair and shouted, No. It can not be. Other students also supported him during that time. In September 1951, at a meeting in the central building of Dhaka University, Matin stated that while there was no objection to Urdu, Bengali should be given equal status. On 11 March 1951, during a rally organized by the East Pakistan Chatra League (Student League) at Dhaka University, he was selected as convener of the Dhaka University Language Action Committee. Khaleque Nawaz Khan, then president of the Chatra League, presided over the meeting. On 30 January 1952, Matin attended another meeting and became a member of the Shorbodolio Rashtrabhasha Kormoporishod (All‑Party State Language Action Committee).

== Other political involvements ==
Matin participated in a procession organized by fourth‑class clerks, during which he was arrested and imprisoned for two months. Following his release, the vice chancellor of the University of Dhaka asked him to sign a bond; when he refused, he was suspended for three years. In April 1952, he played a role in the formation of the Students Union and was elected the second president of its East Pakistan unit. In 1954, he was appointed secretary of the Communist Party's Pabna district unit. Three years later, he joined Maulana Bhasani's National Awami Party (NAP)

In 1958, Matin founded the East Pakistan Communist Party (Marxist–Leninist), adopting the ideology of Charu Majumdar, a communist revolutionary from India.

Following the independence of Bangladesh in 1971, Matin fought against the Jatiya Rakkhi Bahini and was arrested in 1972.

== Death ==
Matin died on 8 October 2014 at Bangladesh Medical University in Dhaka. He was undergoing treatment at the ICU after a stroke on 18 August and was on life support after his condition deteriorated on 3 October.

== Awards ==
Abdul Matin, a prominent leader of the Language Movement, received numerous accolades throughout his life. A selection of his notable awards and honors is listed below:

- Janakantha Gunijan and Pratibha Sammanona (1998): Awarded by the Daily Janakantha, including a grant of 100,000 BDT and a monthly allowance of 5,000 BDT.
- Reception by Expatriate Bangladeshis (2000): A special reception held on 18 February 2000, in New York City to commemorate the Language Movement.
- Ekushey Padak (2001): The second-highest civilian award in Bangladesh.
- Bangla Academy Fellowship (2001): Conferred on 28 December 2001.
- Bangladesh National Museum Honor (2002): A commemorative memento for his contributions.
- 50th Anniversary Reception (2002): Organized by the Bhasha Shainik Sammanona Parishad in Sylhet.
- Ahmed Sharif Memorial Award (2003)
- Jatiya Press Club Development Economics Gold Medal (2004)
- Sher-e-Bangla National Award (2004)
- Liberation War Gono Parishad Honor (2005)
- Daily Amader Shomoy Honor (2006)
- Doctor of Laws (Honoris Causa) (2008): Conferred by the University of Dhaka during its 44th convocation.
- Bhashani Memorial Award (2008)
- Ekushey TV Lifetime Achievement Award
- Safiuddin Ahmed Memorial Award (2010): Named after the activist and journalist.
- Dhaka Ratna Honor (2010): Awarded during the 400th-anniversary celebrations of the city of Dhaka.
- MAPSAS Peace Medal (2010): Awarded by the Human Rights and Environmental Society.
- Abu Zafar Obaidullah Award (2010)
- Mahatma Gandhi Peace Award (2010)
- Daily Kaler Kantho Lifetime Achievement Award (2010)

== Bibliography ==
Abdul Matin's published works include:

- 21 February O 1952 Saler Bhasha Andolon Prosange ২১ ফেব্রুয়ারি ও ১৯৫২ সালের ভাষা আন্দোলন প্রসঙ্গে [On the Occasion of February 21st and the Language Movement of 1952] (in Bengali). Dhaka. 12 February 1979.
- Gono Chin-er Utpadon Byabostha O Dayitto Protha গণ চীনের উৎপাদন ব্যবস্থা ও দায়িত্ব প্রথা [The Production System and Responsibility System of the People's Republic of China] (in Bengali). 1985.
- Bhasha O Ekusher Andolon ভাষা ও একুশের আন্দোলন [Language and the Movement of '21] (in Bengali). Dhaka. 1986.
- Bhasha Andolon Ki Ebong Ta Te Ki Chhilo ভাষা আন্দোলন কি এবং তাতে কি ছিল [What Was the Language Movement and What Did It Entail?] (in Bengali). Dhaka: Nandan Prakashan. February 1989.
- Matin, Abdul; Rafiq, Ahmad (1991). Bhasha Andolon: Itihas O Tatparya ভাষা আন্দোলন: ইতিহাস ও তাৎপর্য: আব্দুল মতিন ও আহমদ রফিক, জাতীয় সাহিত্য প্রকাশনী, ঢাকা ১৯৯১ [The Language Movement: History and Significance] (in Bengali). Dhaka: Jatiya Sahitya Prakashani.
- Bangali Jatir Utso Sandhan O Bhasha Andolon বাঙালী জাতির উৎস সন্ধান ও ভাষা আন্দোলন, বুক পয়েন্ট ও সমাজ চেতনা পাবলিকেশন, ১৯৯৫ [Tracing the Origins of the Bengali Nation and the Language Movement] (in Bengali). Book Point and Samaj Chetana Publications. 1995.
- Jibon Pother Banke Banke জীবন পথের বাঁকে বাঁকে [At Every Turn of Life's Path] (in Bengali). Dhaka: Sahityika. 2004.
