= Tarash Upazila =

Tarash তাড়াশ
- Upazila of Bangladesh
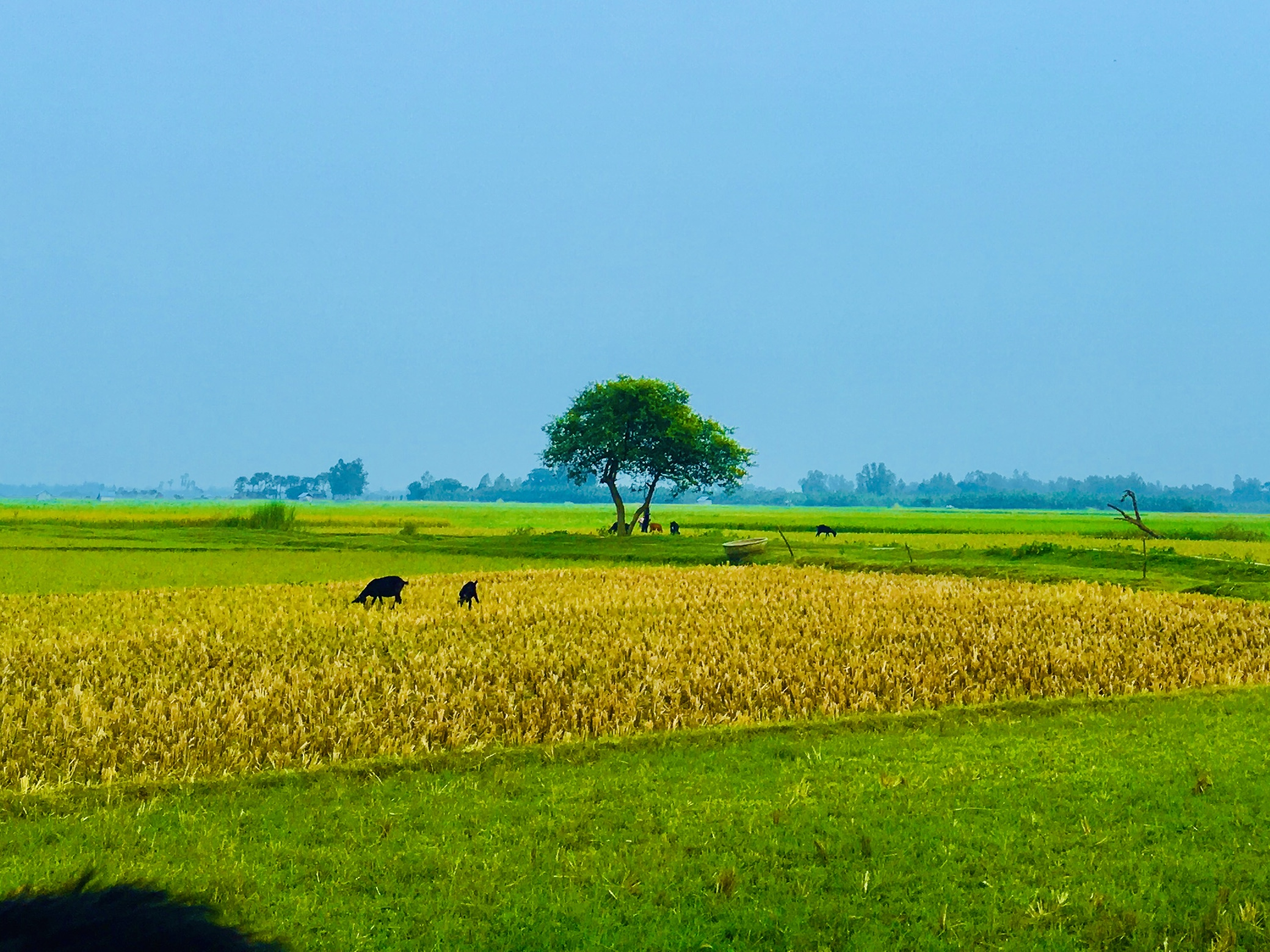
- Chalan Beel

- Coordinates: 24°26′N 89°22.5′E
- Country: Bangladesh
- Division: Rajshahi
- District: Sirajganj

Area
  - Total: 300.07 km^{2} (115.86 sq mi)

Population (2022)
  - Total: 211,853
  - Density: 706.01/km^{2} (1,828.6/sq mi)
- Time zone: UTC+6 (BST)
- Postal code: 6770
- Area code: 07528
- Website: Official Map of Tarash

Tarash Upazila mauza geocode map

Tarash (Bengali: তাড়াশ) is an upazila, or sub-district of Sirajganj District, located in Rajshahi Division, Bangladesh.

== Geography ==
Tarash is located at 24.4333°N 89.3750°E. It has 48,941 households and total area 300.07 km^{2}. The upazila is bounded by Sherpur upazila of Bogra district on the north, Bhangura and Chatmohar upazilas of Pabna district on the south, Raiganj and Ullahpara upazilas on the east, Gurudaspur and Singra upazilas of Natore district on the west.

== Demographics ==
Religions in Tarash Upazila (2022)
Religion	Percent
Islam	91.98%
Hinduism	7.74%
Other or not stated	0.28%

According to the 2022 Bangladeshi census, Tarash Upazila had 56,576 households and a population of 211,853. 8.90% of the population were under 5 years of age. Tarash had a literacy rate (age 7 and over) of 71.87%: 75.14% for males and 68.70% for females, and a sex ratio of 97.99 males for every 100 females. 17,488 (8.25%) lived in urban areas. Ethnic population is 10,196 (4.81%), of which Kurukh are 4,484.

Population of Tarash upazila by ethnicity (2022)
1. Bengali (95.2%)
2. Mahato (2.12%)
3. Others (2.69%)

According to the 2011 Census of Bangladesh, Tarash Upazila had 48,941 households and a population of 197,214. 46,610 (23.63%) were under 10 years of age. Tarash had a literacy rate (age 7 and over) of 38.98%, compared to the national average of 51.8%, and a sex ratio of 1024 females per 1000 males. 8,442 (4.28%) lived in urban areas. Ethnic population was 9,498 (4.82%), mainly Oraon and Mahato.

As of the 1991 Bangladesh census, Tarash has a population of 135435. Males constitute are 50.21% of the population, and females 49.79%. This Upazila's eighteen up population is 68421. Tarash has an average literacy rate of 22.6% (7+ years), and the national average of 32.4% literate.

== Administration ==
Tarash, primarily formed as a Thana, was turned into an upazila in 1983.

Tarash Upazila is divided into Tarash Municipality and eight union parishads:Talam, Baruhas, Deshigram, Madhainagar, Magura Binod, Naogaon, Saguna, and Tarash. The union parishads are subdivided into 171 mauzas and 254 villages.

== Notable people ==
- Ataur Rahman (politician, born 1951)
- Gazi M M Amjad Hossain

== See also ==
- Upazilas of Bangladesh
- Districts of Bangladesh
- Divisions of Bangladesh
- Thanas of Bangladesh
- Union councils of Bangladesh
