= Shahidul Islam Khan =

Bangladeshi politician

- শহিদুল ইসলাম খান

Member of Parliament for Sirajganj-5
- In office 15 April 1988 – 6 December 1990
- Preceded by: Mofiz Uddin Talukder
- Succeeded by: Shahidullah Khan

Personal details
- Party: Jatiya Party (Ershad)

Shahidul Islam Khan is a Jatiya Party (Ershad) politician in Bangladesh and a former Jatiya Sangsad member representing the Sirajganj-5 constituency during 1988–1990.

== Personal life ==
On 16 September 2020, Khan's son, Asif Imtiaz Khan, a Supreme Court lawyer, died after falling from a building in Kathalbagan, Dhaka.
