= Sirajganj District =

Sirajganj District সিরাজগঞ্জ জেলা
- District of Bangladesh
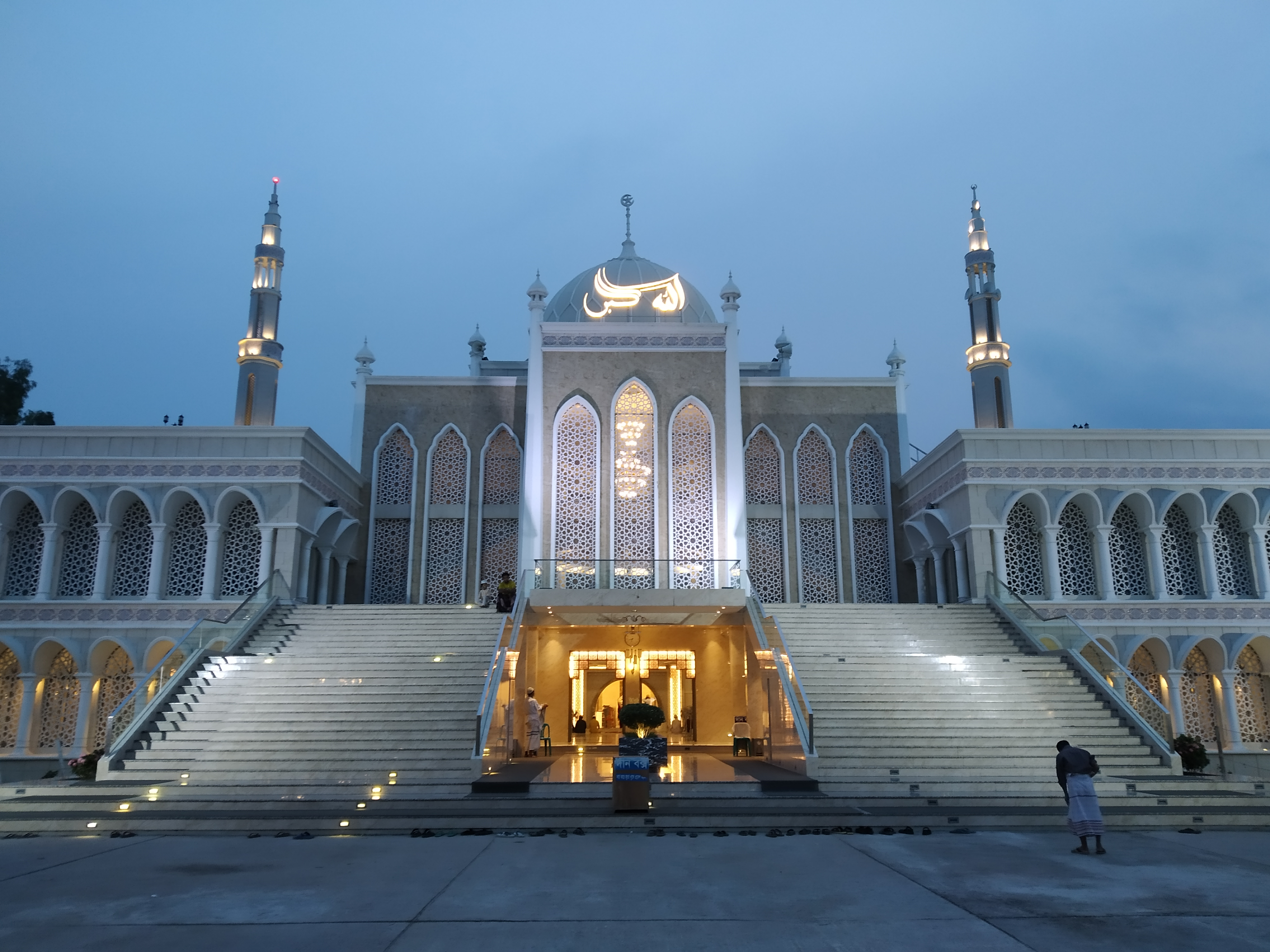
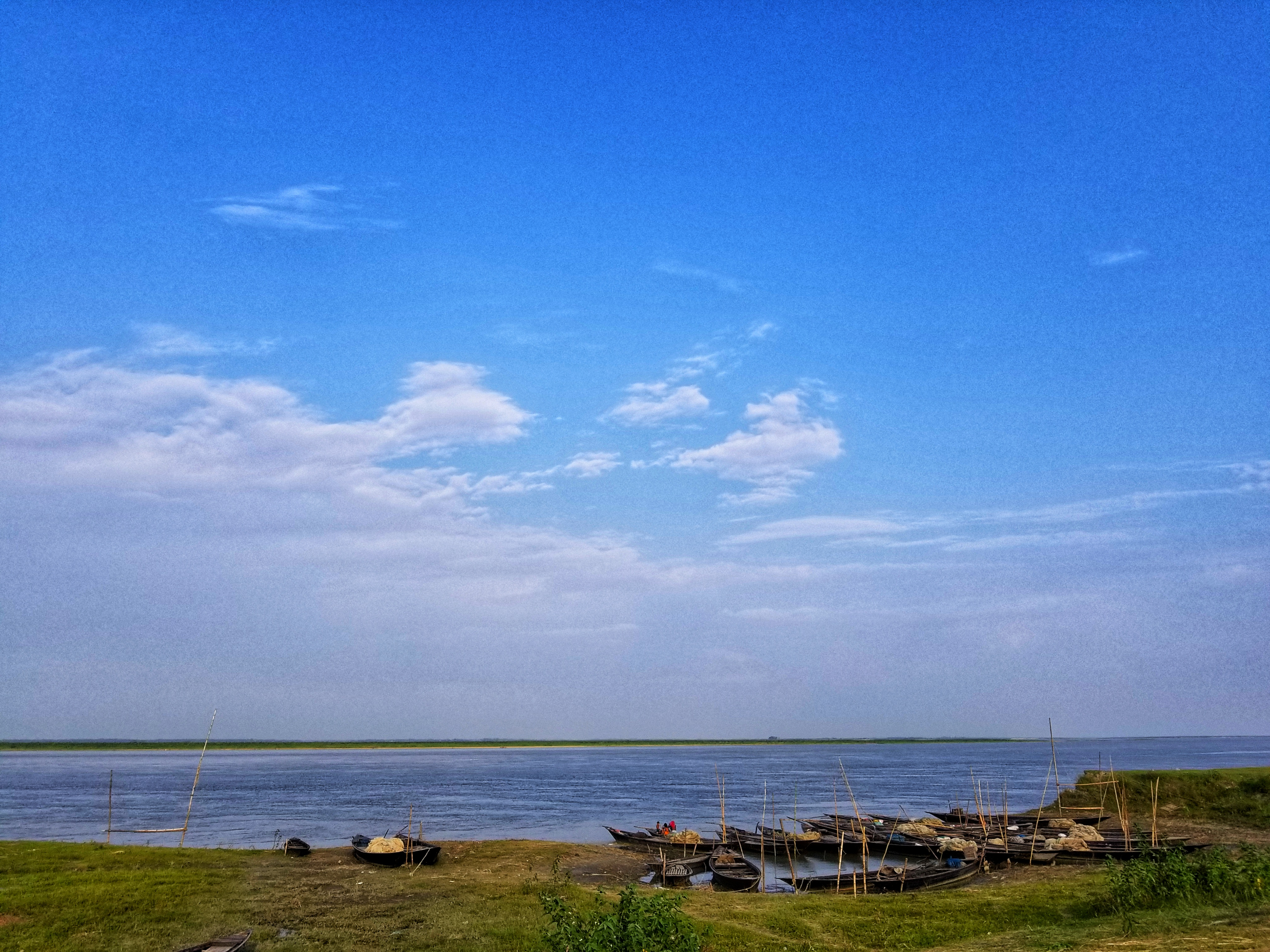
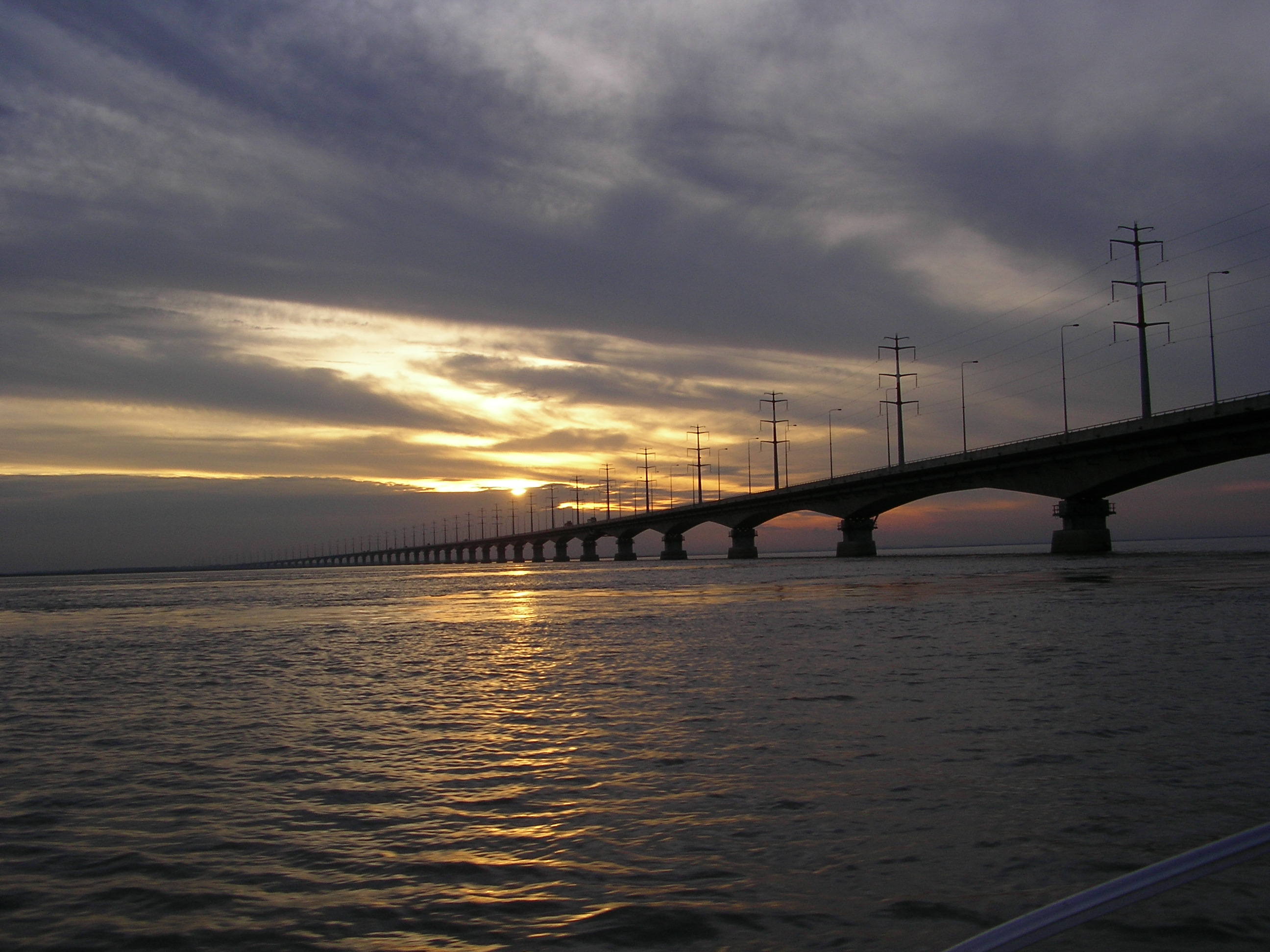
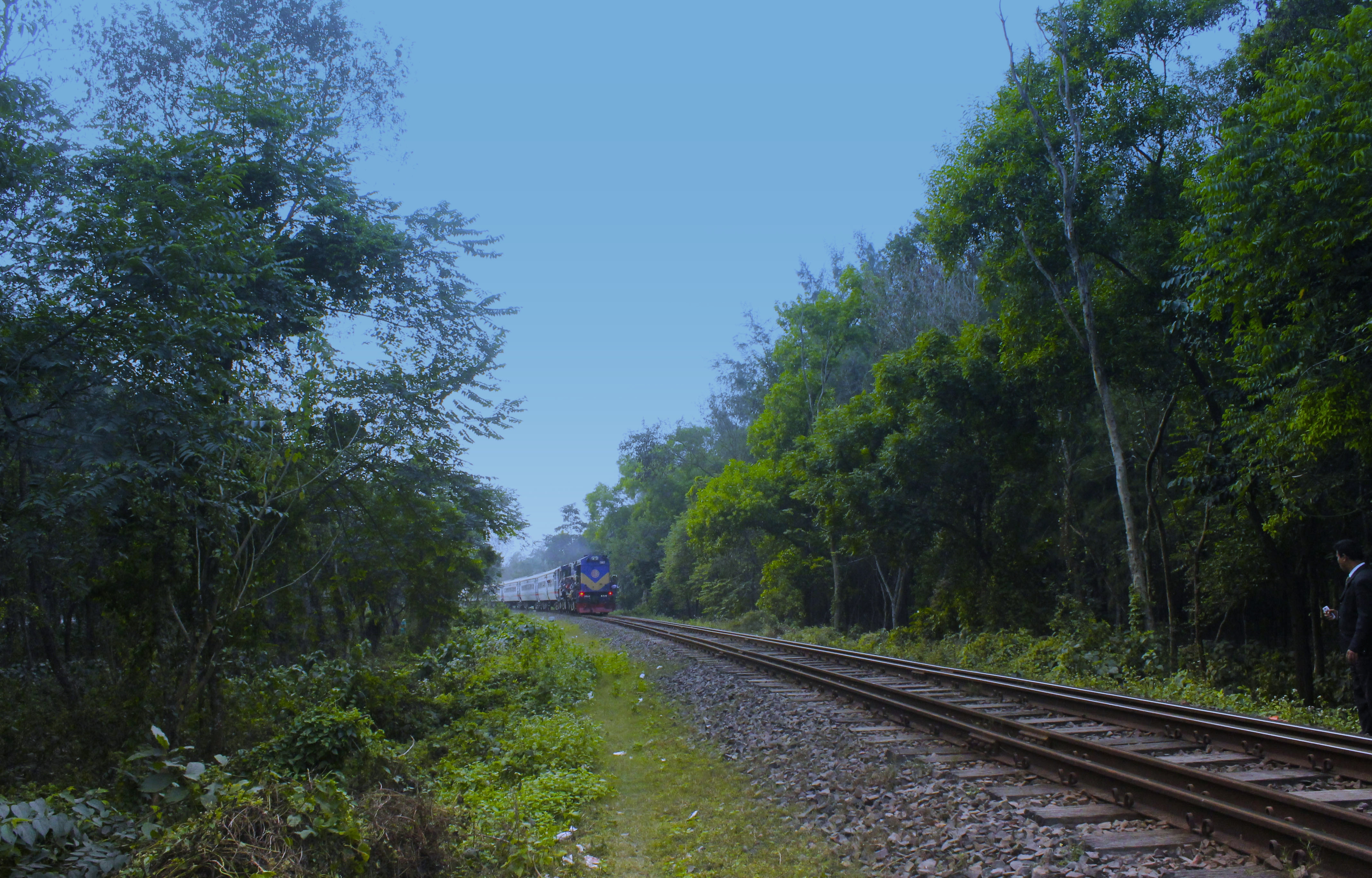
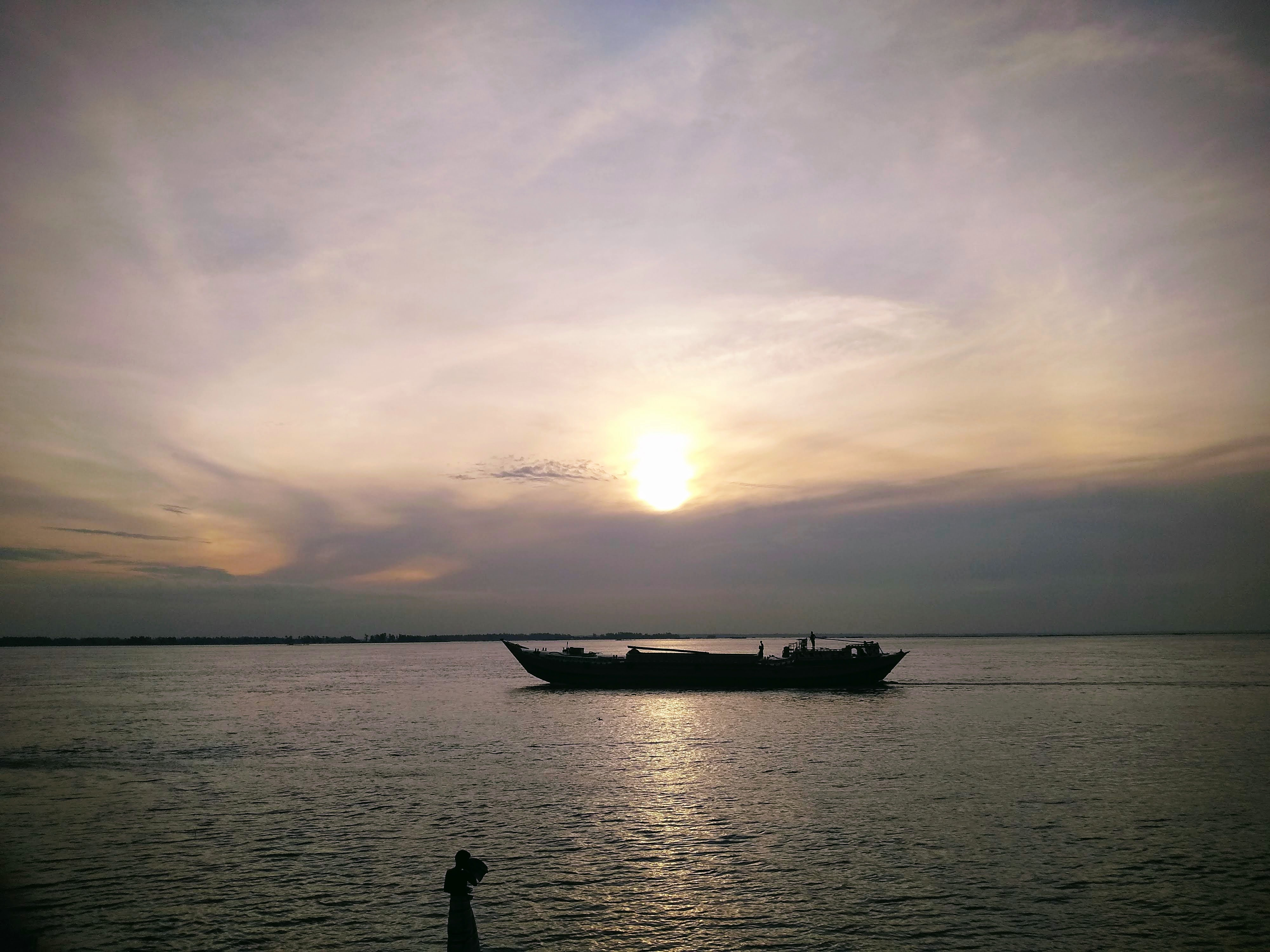
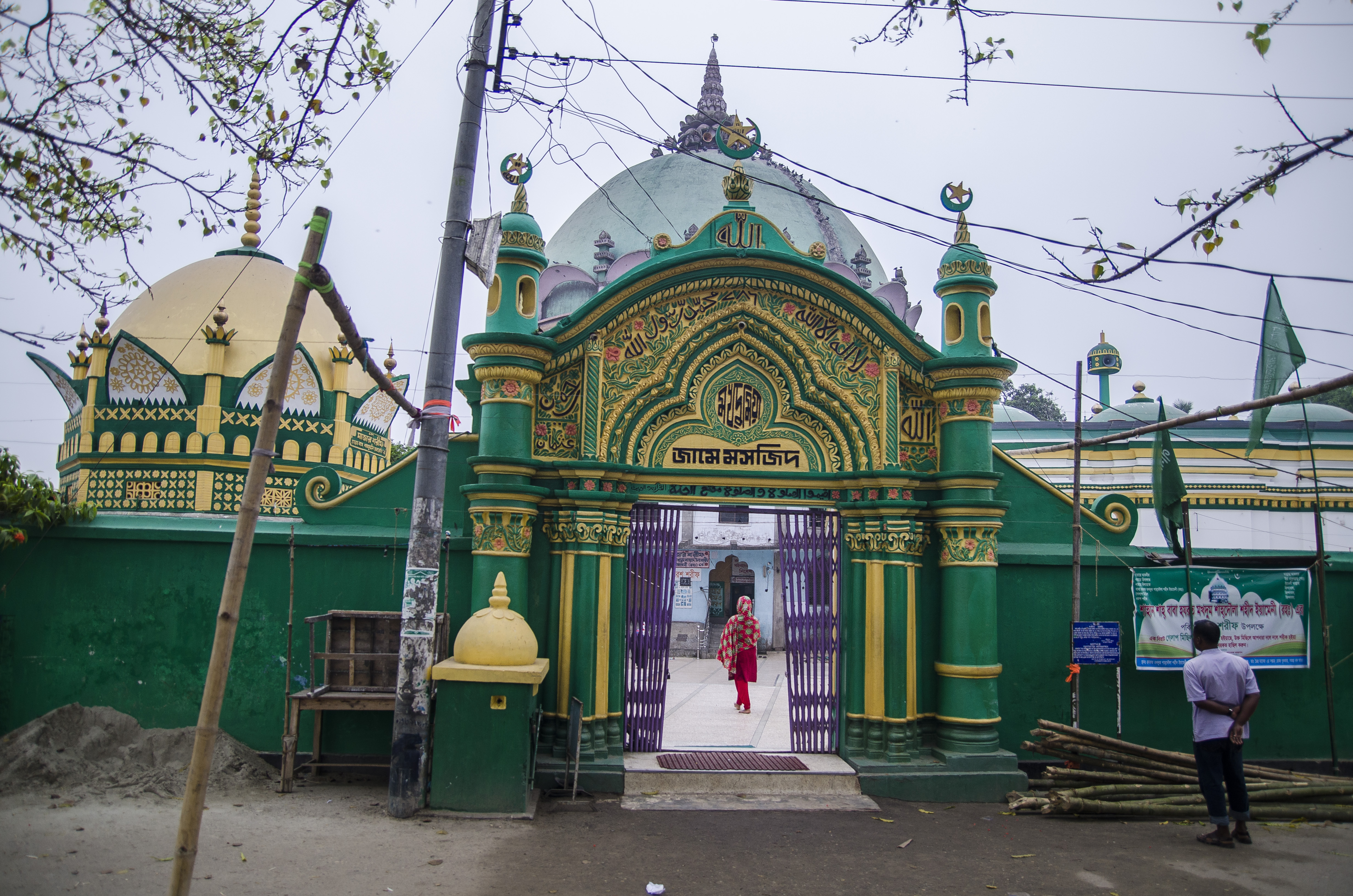
- Clockwise from top-left: Al-Aman Bahela Khatun Mosque, Jamuna Bridge, Hard Point, Dargah of Makhdum Shah Daulah, Jamuna Eco Park, China Barrage
- Nickname: The Gateway to North Bengal
- Location of Sirajganj District in Bangladesh
- Expandable map of Sirajganj District
- Coordinates: 24.33°N 89.62°E
- Country: Bangladesh
- Division: Rajshahi Division
- Established: 1984

Government
  - Deputy Commissioner: Dr. Farook Ahmed

Area
  - Total: 2,402.02 km^{2} (927.43 sq mi)
- Flood plain and Marsh land
- Elevation: 7 m (23 ft)

Population (2022)
  - Total: 3,357,706
  - Density: 1,397.87/km^{2} (3,620.46/sq mi)
- Demonym(s): Sirajganji, Shirazgonji
- Time zone: UTC+06:00 (BST)
- Postal code: 6700
- Area code: 0751
- ISO 3166 code: BD-59
- HDI (2023): 0.696 medium · 7th of 22
- Website: www.sirajganj.gov.bd

Sirajganj District (Bengali: সিরাজগঞ্জ জেলা) is a district in North Bengal, Bangladesh, it is located in Rajshahi Division. It is the 25th largest district by area and 9th largest district by population in Bangladesh. It is known as the gateway to North Bengal.

Its administrative headquarter is Sirajganj. It is famous for its hand-loom cottage industries. In 1885, Sirajganj emerged as a thana. Formerly under Mymensingh District in Dacca Division, it was transferred to Pabna District on 15 February 1866. It was upgraded to become a subdivision of Pabna in 1885. In 1984, it was upgraded to a district.

== History ==
In 1762, a severe earthquake changed the flow of the Jamuna river and created a new river named Baral on the west bank of the Baral river, new land emerged and most of the land in the surrounding areas belonged to zamindar Siraj Ali Chowdhury. Gradually, this area got its recognition as Sirajganj after his name.

The historic Salanga Movement in 1922 led to 1,200 deaths, most notably in a massacre of pro-independence activists on 27 January 1922, referred to as the Salanga massacre in Bengali history and memorialized with "Salanga Day" annually. In 1924, a conference of All India Congress Party there. The convention of Brahmo Samaj in Sirajganj took place in 1928. In 1932, Kazi Nazrul Islam, currently known as the National Poet of Bangladesh visited Sirajganj. In 1940, the then Prime Minister of Bengal, A. K. Fazlul Huq laid the foundation stone of Sirajganj Government College. In 1942, a conference of All-India Muslim League there was attended by Muhammad Ali Jinnah.

== Geography ==
Sirajganj District is the gateway to the North Bengal. It is bordered on the north by Bogra District and Natore District; on the west by Natore District and Pabna District; on the south by Pabna District and Manikganj District; on the east Manikganj District, Tangail District and Jamalpur District. It is composed mainly of low-lying alluvial deposits.

Sirajganj District of Rajshahi Division has an area of about 2,497.92 square kilometres (964.45 sq mi). The main rivers are Jamuna, Baral, Ichamati, Karatoya, Phuljor and Hurasagor. The annual average temperature reaches a maximum of 34.6 °C, and a minimum of 11.9 °C. The annual rainfall is 1,610 millimetres (63 in).

The district has several beels, the largest of which is Chalan Beel on the border with Pabna district.

Sirajganj district is in the Jamuna river basin. The Jamuna forms the eastern border of the district. It contains numerous small chars. The Karatoya river flows into Tarash upazila from Bogura district and flows southeast. It sends distributaries to the Bangali, a previous distributary which flows parallel to it on the east. These rivers flow into the Hurasagar river on Sirajganj's southwest border, which flows southeast into the Jamuna.

== Demographics ==
Historical population
Year	Pop.	±% p.a.
1974	1,559,007	—
1981	1,878,025	+2.70%
1991	2,263,573	+1.88%
2001	2,693,814	+1.76%
2011	3,097,489	+1.41%
2022	3,357,706	+0.74%

According to the 2022 Census of Bangladesh, Sirajganj District has 842,308 households and a population of 3,357,706 with an average 3.93 people per household. Among the population, 651,384 (19.40%) inhabitants are under 10 years of age. The population density is 1,398 people per km^{2}. Sirajganj District has a literacy rate (age 7 and over) of 69.48%, compared to the national average of 74.80%, and a sex ratio of 98.51 males per 100 females. Approximately, 20.25% (680,019) of the population live in urban areas. The ethnic population is 20,319 (0.61%), concentrated in Rayganj and Taras upazilas.

=== Religion ===
Religions in Sirajganj District (2022)
Religion	Percent
Islam	95.61%
Hinduism	4.37%
Other or not stated	0.02%

Religion in present-day Sirajganj district
Religion	1941 (Note: Sirajganj was a subdivision of Pabna district)		1981		1991		2001		2011		2022	
Religion	Pop.	%	Pop.	%	Pop.	%	Pop.	%	Pop.	%	Pop.	%
Islam	816,539	79.52%	1,726,967	91.96%	2,114,864	93.43%	2,551,708	94.72%	2,948,505	95.19%	3,210,116	95.61%
Hinduism	204,842	19.95%	149,479	7.96%	146,032	6.45%	141,406	5.25%	147,514	4.76%	146,523	4.37%
Others (Note: Including Jainism, Christianity, Buddhism, Zoroastrianism, Judaism, Ad-Dharmis, or not stated)	5497	0.54%	1,579	0.08%	2,677	0.12%	700	0.03%	1,470	0.05%	1,067	0.02%
Total Population	1,026,878	100%	1,878,025	100%	2,263,573	100%	2,693,814	100%	3,097,489	100%	3,357,706	100%

Muslims make up 95.61% of the population, while Hindus are 4.37% of the population. The Hindu population has remained relatively constant while the Muslim population has constantly increased. The remaining 0.02% people follow other religions, mainly Christianity and Sarnaism.

== Economy ==
Sirajganj is home to Sirajganj Economic Zone, the largest private economic zone in Bangladesh as of March 2024 spanning 1,041 acres of land. The government is building a flyover to link the zone with the Dhaka-Bogura Highway. The zone supplies water from Jamuna river after treatment.

As of June 2024, Sirajganj has a growing dairy market worth over BDT 100 core and receiving export orders. There are around 33,000 dairy farms in Sirajganj.

== Points of interest ==
- Chalan Beel
- Homestead of Behula
- Shiva Temple
- Maha Prabhu Temple
- Gopinath Bigraha
- Kalika Debi Bigraha
- Pratap Dighi
- Joysagar Dighi
- House of Suchitra Sen
- Sirajganj Economic Zone
- China Barrages
- Jamuna Eco Park
- Tarash Palace
- Navaratna Temple
- Katar Mahal Jamidar bari
- Rautara Jamidar bari
- Sannal Jamidar bari
- Elliott Bridge
- Makka Aoulia Mosque
- Shahjadpur Dargah Mosque
- Shahjadpur Kachharibari
- Tomb of Khaja Yunus Ali Enaetpuri
- Tomb of Shamsuddin Tabrizi
- Tomb of Abdul Ali Baki Shah
- Tomb of Makhdum Shah Doula
- Jamuna Bridge
- House of Maulana Abdul Hamid Khan Bhasani
- House of Syed Ismail Hossain Siraji
- Rasel Park
- Milkvita
- Baghabari Riverport
- Meghai Riverport

== Administration ==
Sirajganj sub-division was established in 1885 under Pabna district and it was turned into a district in 1984. Of the nine upazilas of the district Ullahpara is the largest (414.43 square kilometres (160.01 sq mi)) and Kamarkhanda is the smallest (91.61 square kilometres (35.37 sq mi)). Moreover, the district has six municipals, six Parliament seats, 82 unions and 2016 villages.

=== List of upazilas ===
Sirajganj District upazila geocode map

There are nine (9) Upazilas, namely :

- Sirajganj Sadar Upazila
- Kazipur Upazila
- Ullahpara Upazila
- Shahjadpur Upazila
- Raiganj Upazila
- Kamarkhanda Upazila
- Tarash Upazila
- Belkuchi Upazila
- Chauhali Upazila

== Transport ==
Sirajganj District's transportation system is very good. It has the most important highway and railway of Bangladesh which connects the entire North Bengal and a part of South Bengal with the rest of the country. It is very easy to travel through the district because of its great transport system. It has the 2nd largest bridge Jamuna Bridge and the largest railway bridge of Bangladesh. Sirajganj District is also famous for its River-ports.

Like many other districts in Bangladesh, Sirajganj is also a district with many rivers. The main bridges are Bangabandhu Multipurpose Bridge over the River Jamuna, Nalka Bridge Over the River Foljodre, Eliot Bridge etc.

== Education ==
There are 3 medical colleges in the district, the public Shaheed M. Monsur Ali Medical College, established in 2014, the private North Bengal Medical College & Hospital, established in 2000, and the private Khwaja Yunus Ali Medical College & Hospital, established in 2005. They are respectively allowed to admit 65, 85, and 95 students annually.

There are 2 universities in the district, the public Rabindra University, established in 2017 and the private Khwaja Yunus Ali University, established in 2012.

There are 6 government colleges under National University in the district. They are Islamia Government College, Government Akbar Ali College, Sirajganj Government College, Government Kazipur Mansur Ali College, Government Rashidazzoha Women's College, Government Shahjadpur College.

There are 3 government high schools in the district. They are Bonowari Lal Government High School, Saleha Ishaque Government Girls High School and Kazipur A.M.U. Government Girls High School.

== Notable people ==
- Abdul Hamid Khan Bhashani
- Abdur Rashid Tarkabagish
- Captain M. Monsur Ali
- Jadav Chandra Chakravarti
- Suchitra Sen
- Ismail Hossain Siraji
- Rajanikanta Sen
- Abdul Matin
- Abdul Latif Mirza
- Mahadev Saha
- Rajendra Lahiri
- Makhdum Shah
- Haimanti Sukla
- Abdullah-Al-Muti
- Ishan Chandra Roy
- Bappi Lahiri
- Mohammad Najibar Rahman
- K G Mustafa
- Fateh Lohani
- Khwaja Yunus Ali
- Abu Hena Mustafa Kamal
- Fazle Lohani
- Shakila Zafar
- Mokbula Manzoor
- Hossain Toufique Imam
- Kamal Lohani
- Mohammed Nasim
- Tauquir Ahmed
- Zahid Hasan
- M. A. Matin
- M. A. Muhit
- Kanak Chapa
- Arifur Rahman
- Mohammad Barkatullah
- Samudra Gupta
- Abdul Mannan Talukder
- Mak Yuree
- Husna Banu Khanam
- Abdullah al Mahmood
- Gazi M M Amjad Hossain
- Iqbal Hassan Mahmood
- Ataur Rahman
- Mazharul Islam
- G.A.K. Lohani
- Syeda Issabela
- Amanul Haque
- Motahar Hossain Talukdar
- Kshitish Mohan Lahiri
- Sezan Mahmud
- Abdul Hai Sarker
- Imtiar Shamim
- Kabir Bin Anwar
- Uzzal
- Ibne Mizan
- Dewan Nazrul
- Ali Raj
- M. Rafiqul Islam
- Abdul Latif Mirza
- Malay Bhowmick
- Talukder Moniruzzaman
- Rumana Mahmood
- Abdul Latif Biswas
- Tanveer Imam
- Abdul Momin Talukdar
- Abu Hasan Shahriar
- Hashibur Rahman Swapon
- Manzur Quader
- Abdul Majid Mandal
- Mozammel Haque
- Mirza Muraduzzaman
- Kamruddin Ahia Khan Majlish
- M Akbar Ali
- Ishaque Hossain Talukder
- Ansar Ali Siddiqui
- Mohammad Selim
- Shahidullah Khan
- Md. Habibe Millat
- Mofiz Uddin Talukder
- Dabir Uddin Ahmed
- Rafiqul Islam Bakul
- Syed Hossain Mansur
- Choyon Islam
- Tanvir Shakil Joy
- Shahidul Islam Khan
- Amanul Haque
- Afiea Nusrat Barsha
- Akhi Khatun
