= Chalan Beel =

Wetland in northwest Bangladesh

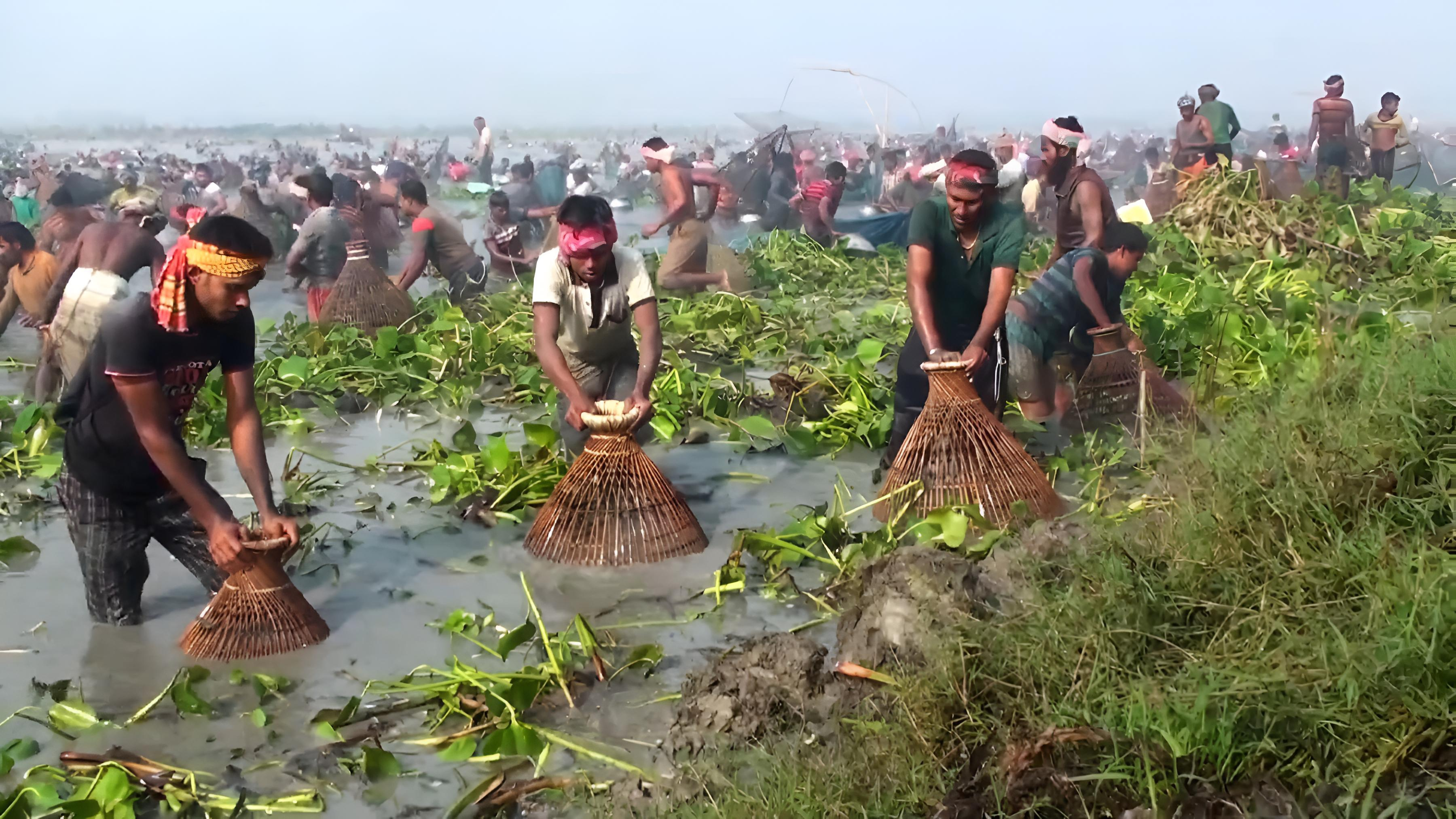
- Fishing during the Baut Festival

- Location within Bangladesh
- Location: Natore (40%) Sirajganj (35%) Pabna (25%) (Rajshahi Division)
- Coordinates: 24.52°N 89.01°E
- Primary inflows: Atrai River and 46 others
- Basin countries: Bangladesh
- Surface area: 26 km^{2} (10 sq mi)
- Average depth: 2 m (6.6 ft)
- Max. depth: 4 m (13 ft)

Chalan Beel (Bengali: চলনবিল) is a wetland in the Sirajganj, Natore and Pabna districts of Bangladesh. It is a large inland depression, marshy in character, with rich flora and fauna. Forty-seven rivers and other waterways flow into the Chalan Beel. As silt builds up in the beel, its size is being reduced.

== History ==
The most important factor dominating the river history in Bengal is the large proportion of silt carried by its rivers. It is the silt which has created the land and made it habitable by building it up through the centuries. It is silt which is fertilising the land, but the silt, which has been the most beneficial gift of nature, has also produced most of the river problems now confronting the people of Bengal. Silt deposited in the old river channel beds has forced them to change course, creating problems for abandoned areas while assisting in developing new areas.

The main volume of water from the Ganges River began flowing through the Padma channel in the sixteenth century. Silt from the Padma helped in building up the southern portion of north Bengal. This is the most plausible explanation for the existence of a depression around Chalan Beel. The Teesta was active in the region until it changed its course in 1787. This territory lies between the land raised in the north by the Teesta system when it was active and that in the south by the Padma.

Another possible explanation for the depression is the ongoing course changes in the Padma. In Ven den Brouck's map of Bengal, prepared in 1660, the main channel of the Padma is shown flowing through Faridpur-Bakharganj. There is a suggestion of another channel, possibly from an earlier time, which runs through Rampur Boalia in Rajshahi, Chalan Beel, Dhaleswari and Buriganga before meeting the Meghna. At that time the Jamuna was virtually non-existent and the Brahmaputra used to flow through its old channel.

Historical depictions of Chalan Beel

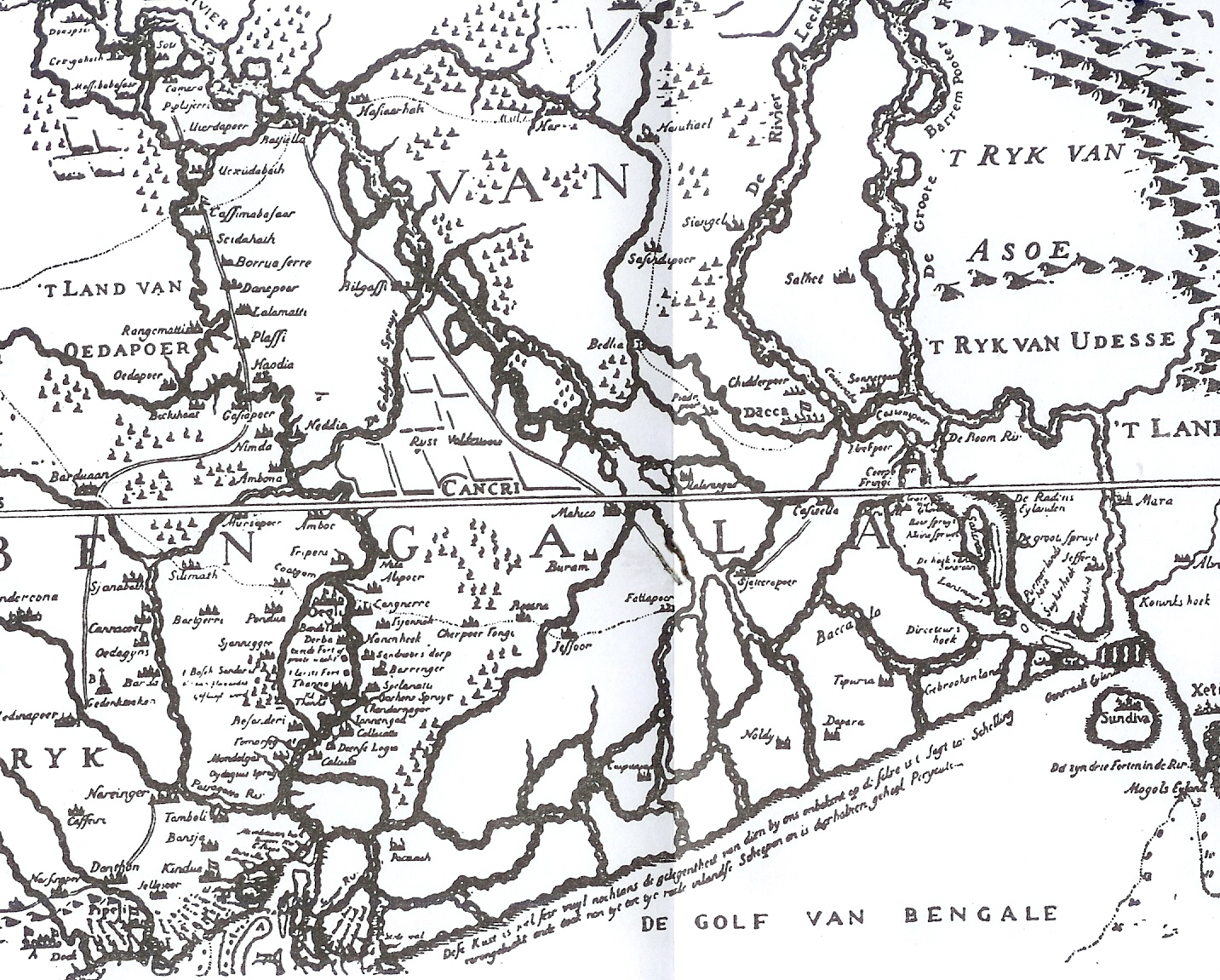
Van den Brouck's map of 1660

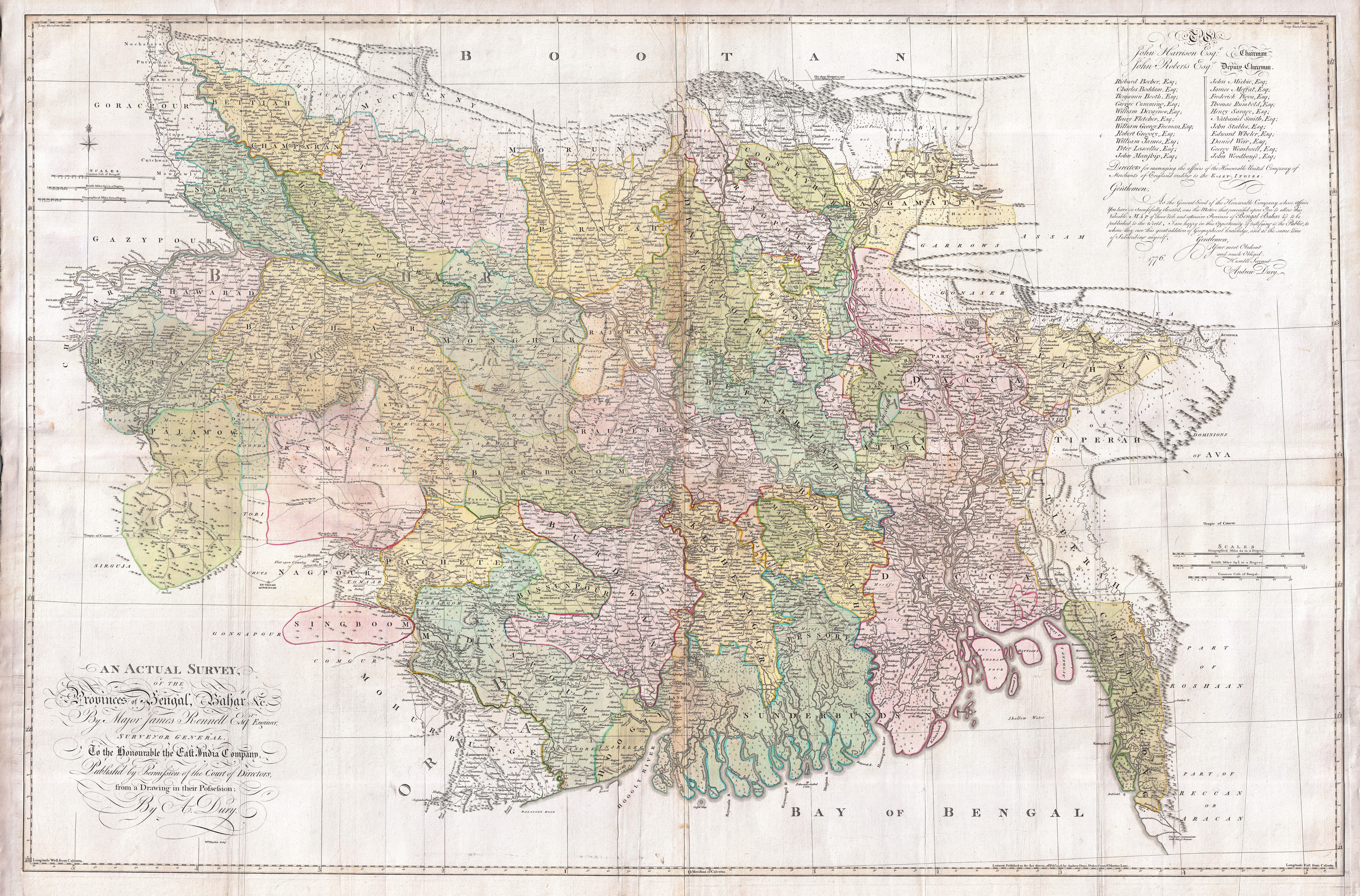
James Rennell's map of 1776

== Impact of railways ==
An estimate taken in 1945 found about 47 rivers and other waterways flowed into the Chalan Beel, a watershed of about 1,547 square miles (4,010 km^{2}). In addition to being a crossroads for the many waterways it also served as the origin for the many rivers flowing south or east that eventually meet with the Padma or Jamuna. In the early 1900s, Chalan Beel began to be hemmed in by the construction of the Eastern Bengal Railway main line on the west and the Santahar-Bogra branch line on the north. The natural pattern of the water's drainage channels in this area were disrupted by the obstruction caused by the railway construction since railways in these low lands had to be built on embankments.

== Flora and fauna ==
The banks of the beel are covered with dense stands of kash, babla, nol, dhol kolmi, simul, and date palm. Seven species of frogs and one species of toad represent the amphibian fauna. Chalan Beel has a total of 34 species of reptiles, including ten turtles and tortoises, nine lizards and various snake species. There are 27 species of mammals from 12 families.

== Pollution ==
Chalan Beel has experienced the negative effects of pesticide use in the surrounding farmlands. In 2010, Bangladesh Agricultural University research, found pesticide use has increased sixfold since 1982, and the fish population of Chalan Beel has halved in the same period. A 25 kilometre highway constructed on the Beel has divided into two and caused havoc on the fish breeding by disrupting their movement. Commercial overfishing, grill and drag net and other destructive fishing have harmed the fish population.

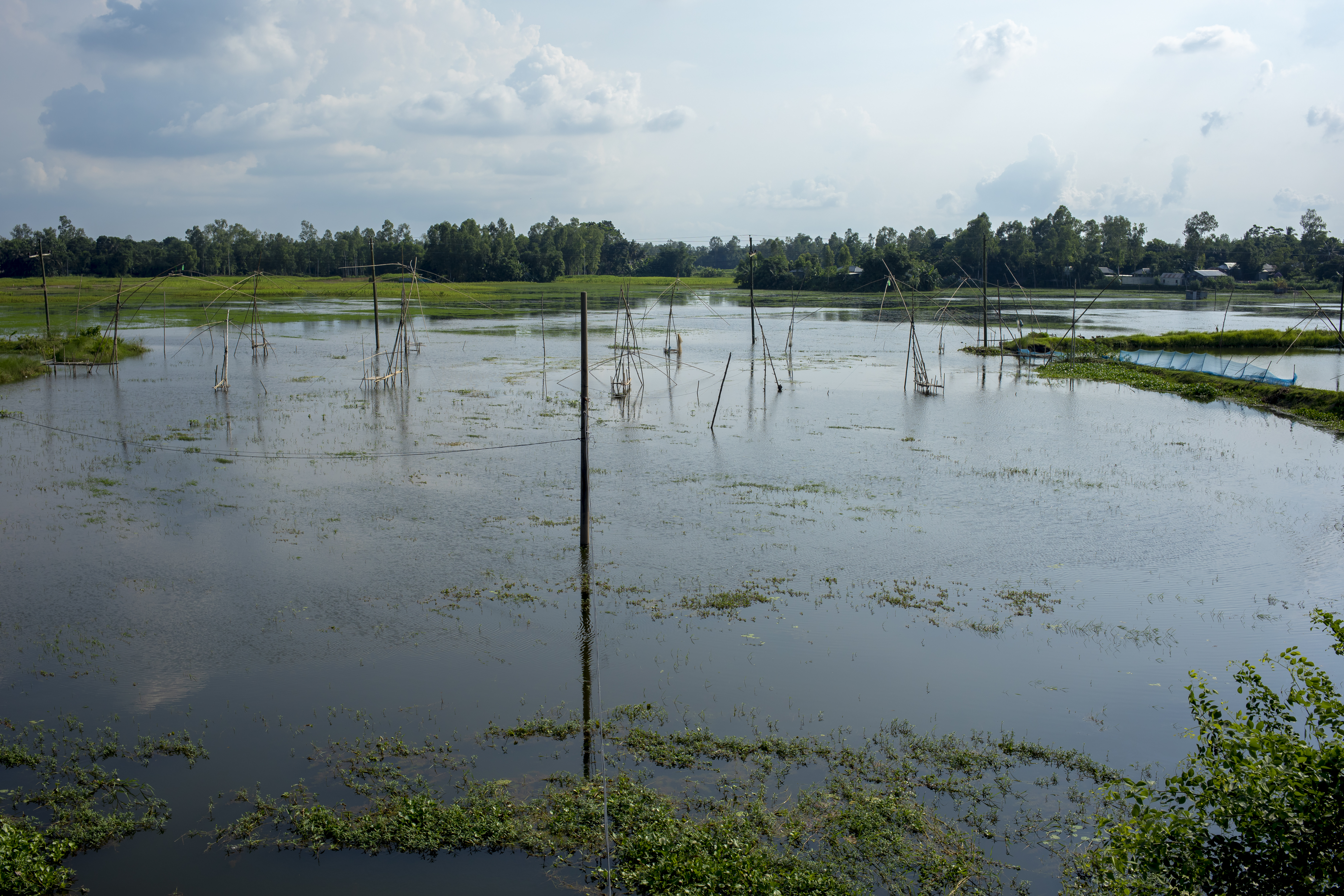
Chalan Beel
