= Al-Aman Bahela Khatun Mosque =

Mosque in Sirajganj, Bangladesh

- আল-আমান বাহেলা খাতুন জামে মসজিদ
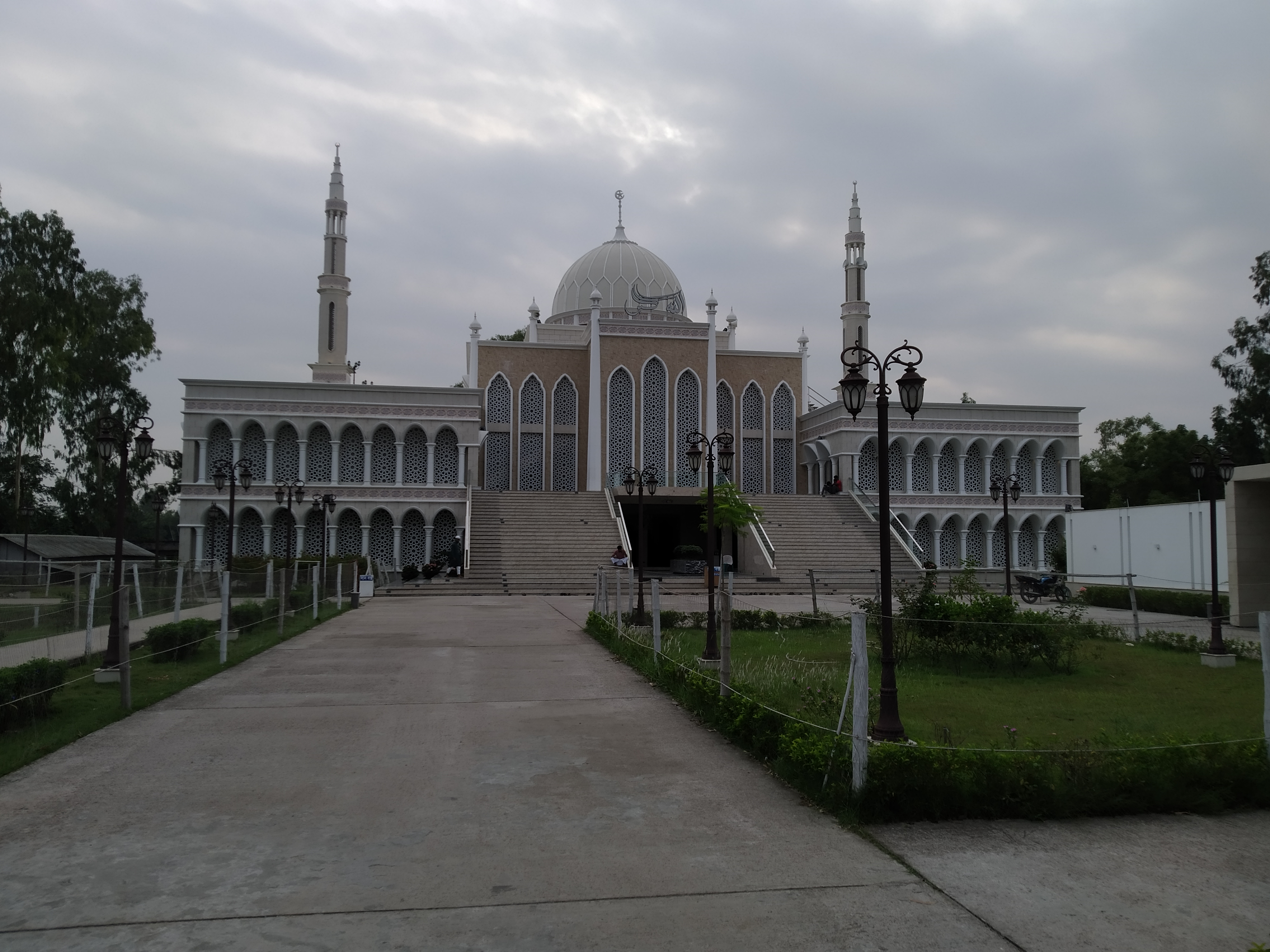

Religion
- Affiliation: Islam
- Ecclesiastical or organisational status: Mosque
- Status: Active

Location
- Location: Sirajganj–Enayetpur Road, Belkuchi, Rajshahi
- Country: Bangladesh
- Interactive map of Al-Aman Bahela Khatun Mosque
- Coordinates: 24°17′14″N 89°41′51″E

Architecture
- Type: Mosque architecture
- Style: Postmodern Islamic
- Founder: Mohammad Ali Sarkar
- Funded by: Mohammad Ali Sarkar
- Groundbreaking: September 2016
- Completed: 2021
- Construction cost: Tk 30 crore

Specifications
- Capacity: 7,000 worshipers
- Dome: One
- Minaret: Two
- Minaret height: 34 m (110 ft)
- Site area: 50,160 square metres (539,900 sq ft)

The Al-Aman Bahela Khatun Mosque (Bengali: আল-আমান বাহেলা খাতুন জামে মসজিদ) is a mosque located at Belkuchi, 20 kilometres (12 mi) southeast of Sirajganj in the Rajshahi Division of Bangladesh. The mosque is a traditional mosque built on 50,160 square metres (539,900 sq ft), or 20 and a half bighas, of land on the west side of Sirajganj-Enayetpur road in Mukandganti mahalla of ward 8 of the Belkuchi municipal area.

Completed in the Postmodern Islamic style, the mosque described as one of the most beautiful and large mosque in Bangladesh. In September 2016, Mohammad Ali Sarkar of Mukundagati village laid the foundation stone of Al-Aman Bahela Khatun Jame Mosque Complex in Belkuchi in the name of his son Al-Aman and mother Bahela Khatun. He built the mosque at his own expense, spending more than Tk 30 crore. It took four years to build. An average of 45 workers worked every day on the construction.

== History ==
In September 2016, Mohammad Ali Sarkar, of Mukundagati village, laid the foundation stone of Al-Aman Bahela Khatun Jame Mosque Complex in the name of his son Al-Aman and mother Bahela Khatun on 2.5 bighas of land south of Belkuchi Municipality. He built the mosque at his own expense at a cost of over Tk 30 crore. It took four years to build. From the beginning, an average of 45 workers have worked every day.

== Architecture ==
The mosque has a large grey dome. In addition, the floor is covered with white tiles and pillars are covered with marble. On the third floor of the mosque there are domes and in other places there are several lighted chandeliers. There are two 34-metre-high (110 ft) minarets on either side. The mosque is surrounded by white pillars, high windows, white tiles and green grass in the courtyard.

== See also ==
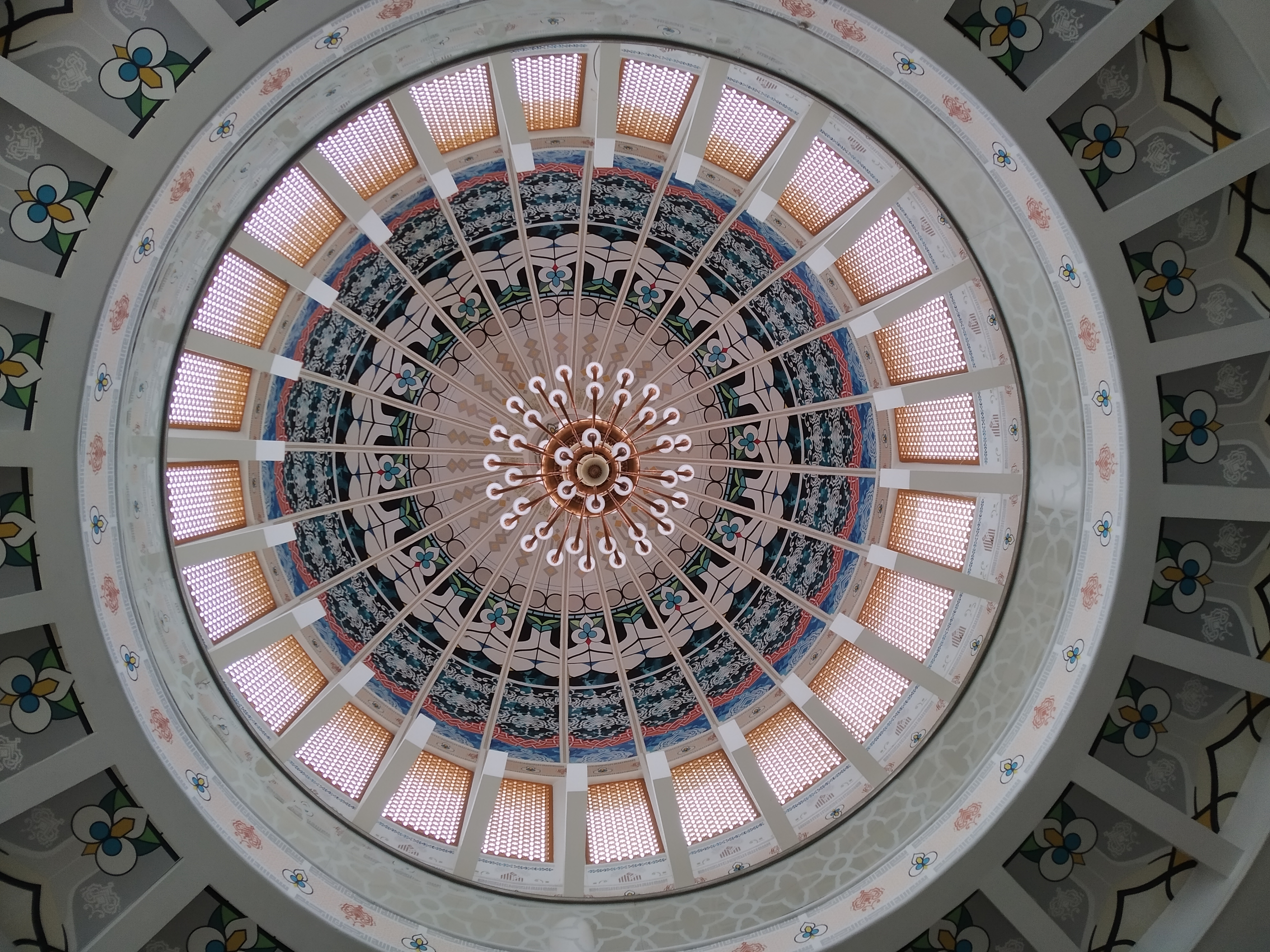
Interior view of main dome

- Islam in Bangladesh
- List of mosques in Bangladesh
