= Chauhali Upazila =

Chauhali চৌহালি
- Upazila of Bangladesh
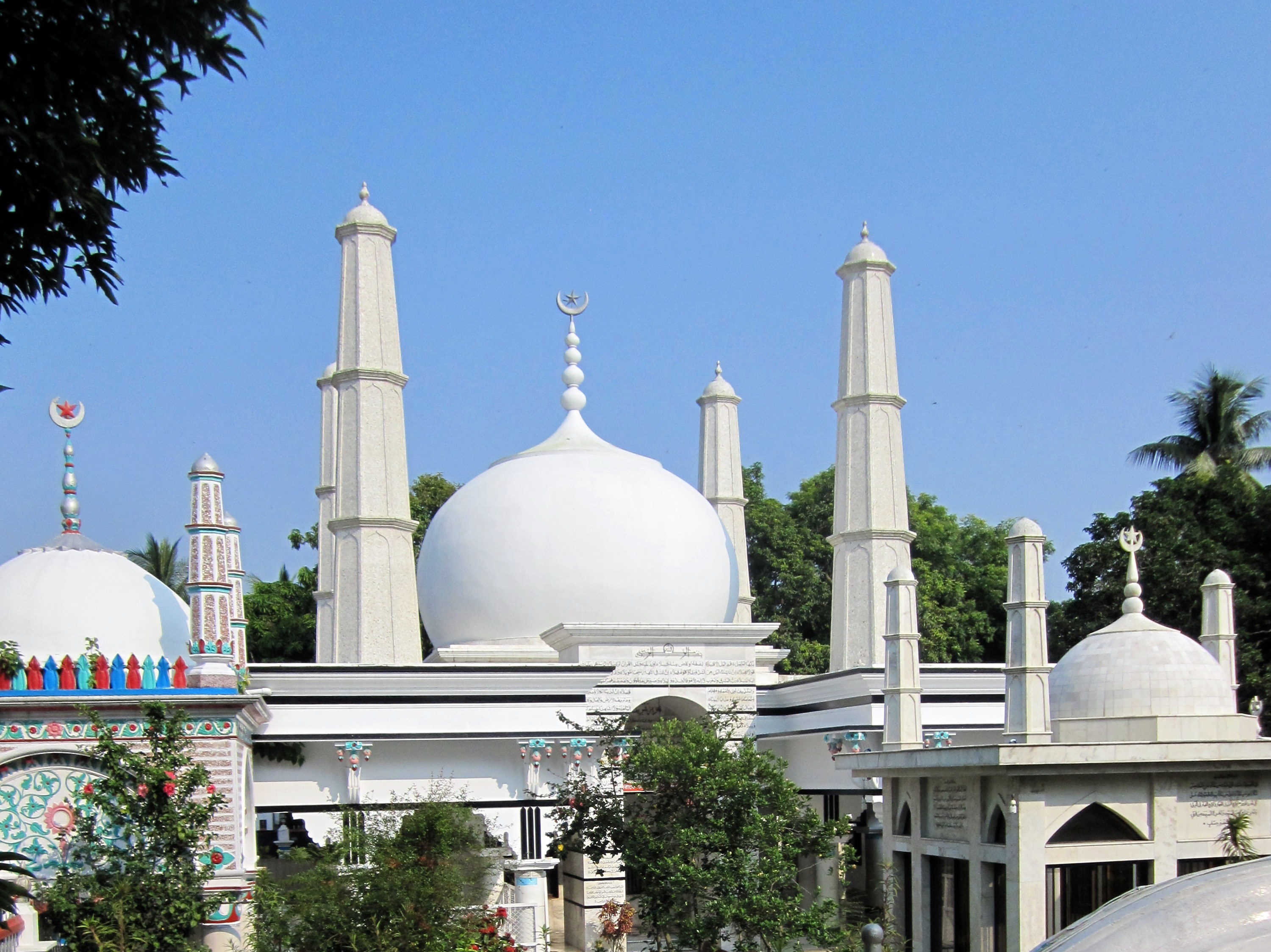
- Shrine of Khwaja Yunus Ali

- Coordinates: 24°12.7′N 89°43.2′E
- Country: Bangladesh
- Division: Rajshahi
- District: Sirajganj

Area
  - Total: 210.39 km^{2} (81.23 sq mi)

Population (2022)
  - Total: 138,061
  - Density: 656.21/km^{2} (1,699.6/sq mi)
- Time zone: UTC+6 (BST)
- Postal code: 6744
- Area code: 07523
- Website: Official Map of Chauhali

Chauhali Upazila mauza geocode map

Chauhali (Bengali: চৌহালি) is an upazila, or sub-district, of Sirajganj District, located in Rajshahi Division, Bangladesh.

== Geography ==
Chauhali is located at 24.2111°N 89.7208°E It has a total area of 210.39 km^{2}. It is bounded on the north by Belkuchi Upazila, on the south by Pabna District Bera Upazila and Manikganj District Daulatpur Upazila, on the east Tangail District by Nagarpur Upazila and Shahjadpur Upazila to the west. Jamuna. The river Jamuna divides Chowhali upazila into two parts. On the east side of the river are five unions of the upazila namely Khaskaulia, Bagutia, Umarpur, Khaspukuria and Ghorjan and on the west side Sodia. Chauhali is a char area as it is adjacent to the river Jamuna. The distance from Sirajganj district headquarters to Chowhali by road is about 90 km. Due to the erosion of the river Jamuna at different times, the land of the upazila is often lose in the river. In 2014, 10 percent of the land of the upazila was lost in the river. In the same year, many other administrative establishments, including the Upazila Parishad Complex, were washed away and relocated.

== Demographics ==
Religions in Chauhali Upazila (2022)
Religion	Percent
Islam	99.49%
Hinduism	0.48%
Other or not stated	0.03%

According to the 2022 Bangladeshi census, Chouhali Upazila had 34,449 households and a population of 138,061. 11.22% of the population were under 5 years of age. Chouhali had a literacy rate (age 7 and over) of 62.72%: 65.03% for males and 60.41% for females, and a sex ratio of 100.42 males for every 100 females. 39,250 (28.43%) lived in urban areas.

According to the 2011 Census of Bangladesh, Chauhali Upazila had 39,832 households and a population of 160,063. 46,420 (29.00%) were under 10 years of age. Chauhali had a literacy rate (age 7 and over) of 36.52%, compared to the national average of 51.8%, and a sex ratio of 995 females per 1000 males. 21,168 (13.22%) lived in urban areas.

According to the 2001 Bangladesh census, Chauhali has a population of 155260; male constituted 81507 of the population, females 73753; Muslim 153036, Hindu 2194, Buddhist 23 and others 7.

As of the 1991 Bangladesh census, Chauhali had a population of 108459. Males constitute 51.37% of the population, and females 48.63%. This Upazila's eighteen up population is 52185. Chauhali has an average literacy rate of 23.1% (7+ years), and the national average of 32.4% literate.

== Administration ==
Chauhali, primarily formed as a Thana, was turned into an upazila in 1984.

Chauhali Upazila is divided in seven union parishads: Baghutia, Gharjan, Khaskaulia, Khaspukuria, Omarpur, Sadia Chandpur, and Sthal. The union parishads are subdivided into 90 mauzas and 102 villages.

== Notable people ==
- Abdul Matin, language activist, was born at Dhublia in 1926.

== See also ==
- Districts of Bangladesh
- Divisions of Bangladesh
- Upazila
