= Kamarkhanda Upazila =

Kamarkhanda কামারখন্দ
- Upazila of Bangladesh
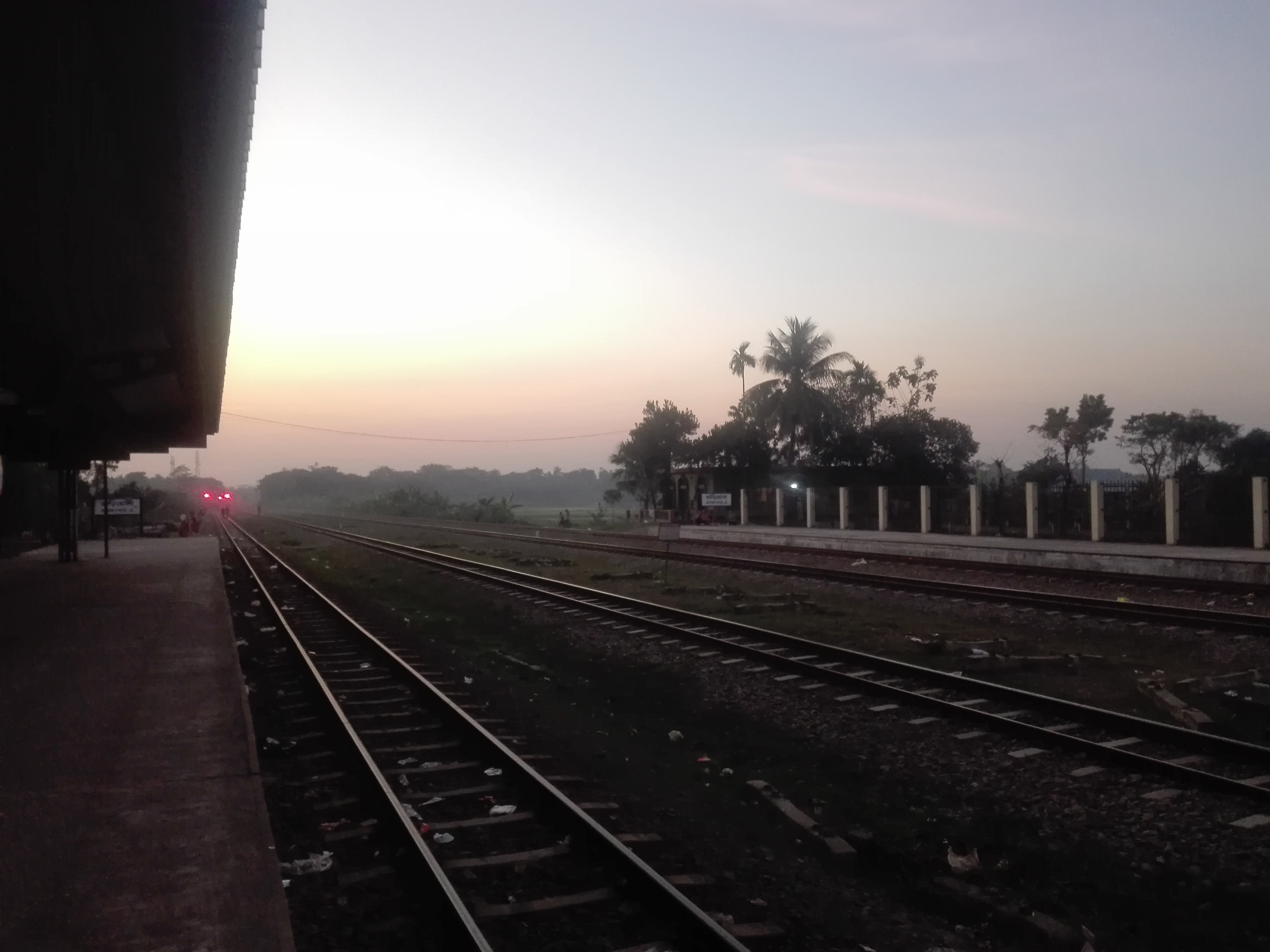
- Jamtoil Rail Station

- Location of Sirajganj District in Bangladesh
- Coordinates: 24°22′N 89°42.3′E
- Country: Bangladesh
- Division: Rajshahi
- District: Sirajganj

Area
  - Total: 90.80 km^{2} (35.06 sq mi)

Population (2022)
  - Total: 154,386
  - Density: 1,700/km^{2} (4,404/sq mi)
- Time zone: UTC+6 (BST)
- Postal code: 6730
- Area code: 07524
- Website: Official Map of Kamarkhanda

Kamarkhanda Upazila mauza geocode map

Kamarkhanda (Bengali: কামারখন্দ) is an upazila, or sub-district of Sirajganj District, located in Rajshahi Division, Bangladesh.

== Geography ==
Kamarkhanda is located at 24.3667°N 89.7042°E. It has 31,961 households and total area 90.80 km^{2}. It is bounded by Sherpur and Dhunat upazilas of Bogra district on the north, Ullahpara and Belkuchi upazilas on the south, Sirajganj Sadar and Belkuchi upazilas on the east, Tarash upazila on the west.

== Demographics ==
Religions in Kamarkhanda Upazila (2022)
Religion	Percent
Islam	97.30%
Hinduism	2.70%
Other or not stated	0.00%

According to the 2022 Bangladeshi census, Kamarkhanda Upazila had 38,655 households and a population of 154,386. 9.75% of the population were under 5 years of age. Kamarkhanda had a literacy rate (age 7 and over) of 73.17%: 75.39% for males and 71.08% for females, and a sex ratio of 95.29 males for every 100 females. 26,104 (16.91%) lived in urban areas.

According to the 2011 Census of Bangladesh, Kamarkhanda Upazila had 31,961 households and a population of 138,645. 33,769 (24.36%) were under 10 years of age. Kamarkhanda had a literacy rate (age 7 and over) of 46.24%, compared to the national average of 51.8%, and a sex ratio of 1027 females per 1000 males. 9,913 (7.15%) lived in urban areas.

According to the 2001 Bangladesh census, Kamarkhanda has a population of 2,67,522; males constituted 137574 of the population, females 129948.

As of the 1991 Bangladesh census, Kamarkhanda has a population of 105,997. Males constitute 51.81% of the population, and females 48.19%. This Upazila's eighteen up population is 51,649. Kamarkhanda has an average literacy rate of 26.2% (7+ years), and the national average of 32.4% literate.

== Administration ==
Raiganj Thana was formed in 1937 and it was turned into an upazila in 1984.

Kamarkhanda Upazila is divided into four union parishads: Bhadraghat, Jamtail, Jhawail, and Roydaulatpur. The union parishads are subdivided into 55 mauzas and 93 villages.

== See also ==
- Upazilas of Bangladesh
- Districts of Bangladesh
- Divisions of Bangladesh
- Thanas of Bangladesh
- Union councils of Bangladesh
