= Ishaque Hossain Talukder =

Bangladeshi politician

Member of Bangladesh Parliament

Personal details
- Party: Bangladesh Awami League

Ishaque Hossain Talukder was a Bangladesh Awami League politician and a member of parliament for Sirajganj-3.

== Early life ==
Talukder was born on 18 June 1950.

== Career ==
Talukder was elected to parliament from Sirajganj-3 as a Bangladesh Awami League candidate in 2008.

== Death ==
Talukder died on 6 October 2014.
