= Abdul Latif Biswas (Bangladeshi politician) =

Bangladeshi politician, diplomat, and freedom fighter

Muhammad Abdul Latif Biswas
- Born: 11 January 1953 (age 73); Meghulla village, Belkuchi Upazila, Sirajganj District, East Bengal, Dominion of Pakistan

Muhammad Abdul Latif Biswas (born 11 January 1953) is a Bangladeshi politician, diplomat, and freedom fighter. He is currently serving as District Council Administrator of Sirajganj District as of September 2022.

== Early life and education ==
Biswas was born in Meghulla village, Belkuchi Upazila, Sirajganj District in erstwhile Pakistan). He passed the matriculation exam from Belkuchi Pilot High School. and intermediate examination in 1986 from Belkuchi Degree College.

== Career ==
Biswas became a Bangladesh Member of Parliament for constituency Sirajganj-5 in 1996 when the Bangladesh Awami League headed Bangladesh's coalition government. He lost his position before being reelected in 2009. He was the minister of Fisheries and Livestock until January 2014. On 10 September 2022 he selected as chairman of Sirajganj district councils for second consecutive terms.
