= Belkuchi Upazila =

Belkuchi বেলকুচি
- Upazila of Bangladesh
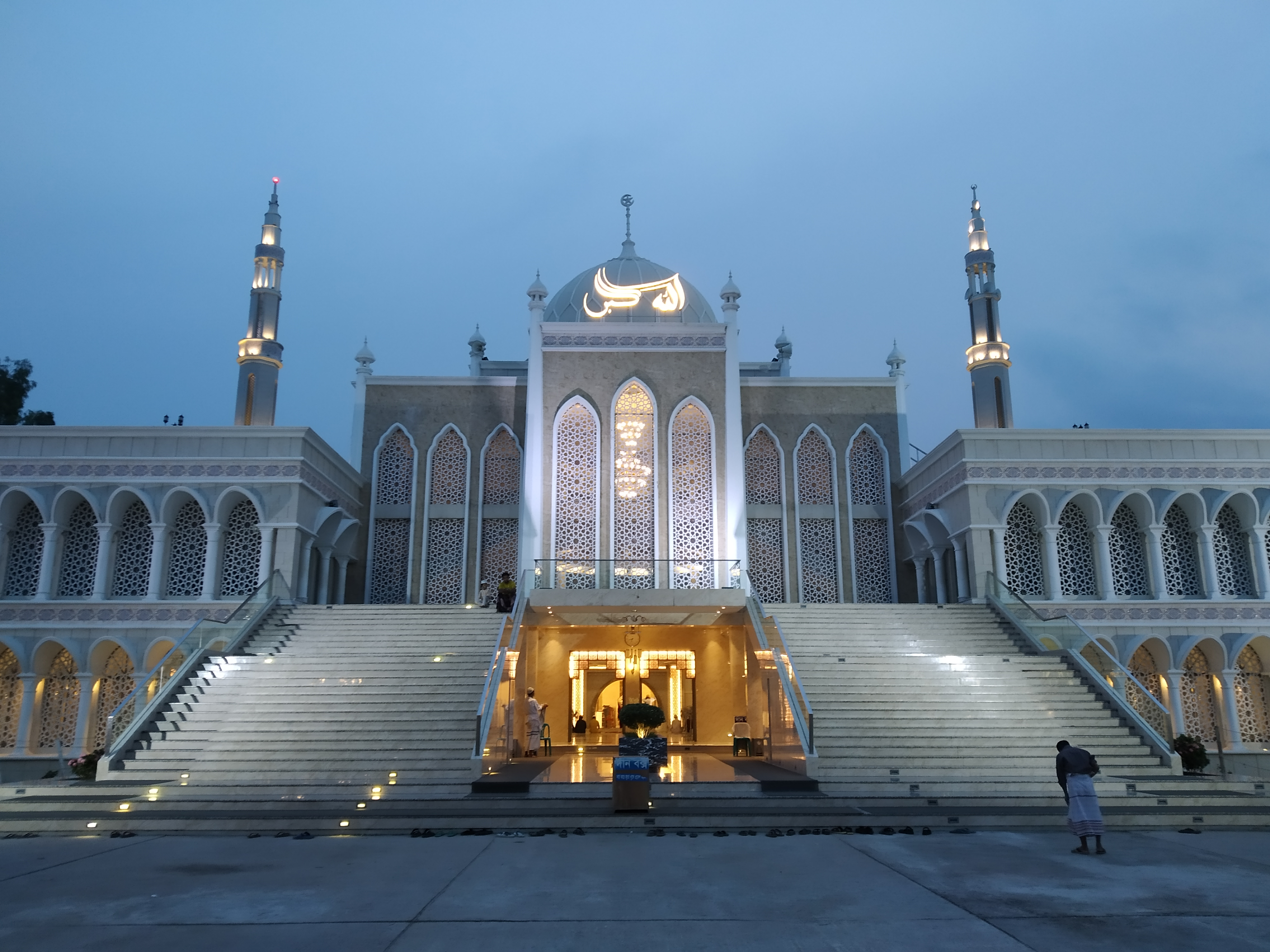
- Al-Aman Bahela Khatun Mosque

- Location of Sirajganj District in Bangladesh
- Coordinates: 24°17.5′N 89°42′E
- Country: Bangladesh
- Division: Rajshahi
- District: Sirajganj

Area
  - Total: 158.87 km^{2} (61.34 sq mi)

Population (2022)
  - Total: 401,172
  - Density: 2,525.2/km^{2} (6,540.1/sq mi)
- Time zone: UTC+6 (BST)
- Postal code: 6740
- Area code: 07522
- Website: www.bangladesh.gov.bd/maps/images/sirajganj/Belkuchi.gif

Belkuchi Upazila mauza geocode map

Belkuchi (Bengali: বেলকুচি) is an upazila, or sub-district of Sirajganj District, located in Rajshahi Division, Bangladesh.

== Geography ==
Belkuchi is located at 24.2917°N 89.7000°E. It has 74,450 households and a total area of 158.87 km^{2} (61.34 sq mi). There are two main rivers, Jamuna and Hurasagar. Chandni Beel is an important water body.

The upazila is bounded by Sirajganj sadar upazila on the north, Shahjadpur and Chauhali upazilas on the south, Kalihati and Tangail Sadar upazilas on the east, Kamarkhanda and Ullahpara upazilas on the west.

== Demographics ==
Religions in Belkuchi Upazila (2022)
Religion	Percent
Islam	95.39%
Hinduism	4.60%
Other or not stated	0.01%

According to the 2022 Bangladeshi census, Belkuchi Upazila had 96,110 households and a population of 401,172. 9.64% of the population were under 5 years of age. Belkuchi had a literacy rate (age 7 and over) of 72.68%: 75.23% for males and 70.09% for females, and a sex ratio of 101.77 males for every 100 females. 96,533 (24.06%) lived in urban areas.

According to the 2011 Census of Bangladesh, Belkuchi Upazila had 74,450 households and a population of 352,835. 90,908 (25.77%) were under 10 years of age. Belkuchi had a literacy rate (age 7 and over) of 45.66%, compared to the national average of 51.8%, and a sex ratio of 963 females per 1000 males. 75,364 (21.36%) lived in urban areas.

As of the 1991 Bangladesh census, Belkuchi has a population of 245164. Males constitute are 52.49% of the population, and females 47.51%. This Upazila's eighteen up population is 116311. Belkuchi has an average literacy rate of 33.6% (7+ years), and the national average of 32.4% literate.

== Administration ==
Belkuchi Thana was formed in 1921 and it was turned into an upazila in 1983.

Belkuchi Upazila is divided into Belkuchi Municipality and six union parishads: Bara Dhul, Belkuchi, Bhangabari, Daulatpur, Dhukariabera, and Rajapur. The union parishads are subdivided into 94 mauzas and 131 villages.

Belkuchi Municipality is subdivided into 9 wards and 14 mahallas.

== Education ==
There are five colleges in the upazila. They include Belkuchi Mahila College, founded in 1998, Belkuchi Model College, Dawlatpur Degree College (1996), and Rajapur College. Belkuchi College, founded in 1970, is the only honors level one.

According to Banglapedia, Daulatpur High School, founded in 1918, Saidabad High School (1965), Satinath Academy, Shyam Kishore Pilot High School (1913), Sohagpur Pilot Girls' High School (1967),Belkuchi Shishu Academy (1983) and Sohagpur SK Pilot Model High School are notable secondary schools.

The madrasa education system includes four fazil madrasas.

== Notable people ==
- Suchitra Sen, actress

== See also ==
- Upazilas of Bangladesh
- Districts of Bangladesh
- Divisions of Bangladesh
