= Noor Ahmed Ghazi =

- নূর আহমেদ গাজী
- Born: Chandpur Sadar Upazila, Bangladesh
- Died: 1971

Noor Ahmed Ghazi (Born: Unknown - Died: 1971) was a freedom fighter of Bangladesh Liberation War. He was awarded the title of Bir Bikram by the Government of Bangladesh for his bravery in the War of Independence.

== Early and education ==
Noor Ahmed Ghazi was born in Chandpur Sadar Upazila Govindia village. His father's name is Farman Ali Ghazi and mother's name is Dudh Meher. His wife's name is Khairun Necha. They have two sons and a daughter.

== Career ==
Noor Ahmed Ghazi served in the Pakistan Army Corps of Electrical and Mechanical Engineering. Worked in Quetta, Pakistan (then West Pakistan). He was on leave in March 1971. When the liberation war started, he joined the war on the Bangladeshi side. After the war of resistance, he fought in different places of Chandpur district under sector number 2. He was known as Nuru Major.

=== Role in the Liberation War ===
A group of freedom fighters had been staying in Bakharpur village since August. Bakharpur is a village in Chandpur Sadar upazila, Chandpur District, Bangladesh. It is six miles from the city of Chandpur. Nur Ahmed Gazi is the leader of the freedom fighters. Freedom fighters are part of the party.

In the 1 September camp (Mazumdarbari), only five freedom fighters including Nur Ahmed Gazi. The rest went to another operation. Most of those in the camp are poor. They have been operating on each other for the past few days. They also arrested some of the razakars in an operation that day. The prisoners are in their camps. At night the freedom fighters slept in the camp. Two guards are on duty.

The Pakistani army attacked them to rescue the captured Razakars. The freedom fighters had SLRs, Stenguns, rifles and hand grenades. There was only one weapon. From morning the freedom fighters started the war. Both sides suffered heavy casualties in the fighting. Several soldiers were killed and wounded. Pakistani soldiers and civilians were also killed.

At eight o 'clock in the morning the freedom fighters ' firing was almost over. Noor Ahmad Ghazi asked his surviving comrades to retreat. He was shot and killed shortly after along with eight freedom fighters. The other militants managed to escape but were injured. Fifteen Pakistani soldiers and Razakars were killed in the fighting and most of the captured Razakars died in the crossfire.

== Awards and honors ==
- Bir Bikrom, third highest gallantry award in Bangladesh
