= Roshu Kha =

Bangladeshi serial killer (born 1976/77)

- Born: 1976 or 1977
- Convictions: Murder (2 counts); Rape
- Penalty: Death

Details
- Victims: 11
- Span of crimes: 2007–2009
- Country: Bangladesh
- State: Chandpur District
- Date apprehended: October 7, 2009

Roshu was the first documented serial killer in Bangladesh. Before killing women, he used to rape them. He confessed to murdering 11 women. His victims were female garment workers aged between 17 and 35.

== Early life ==
Roshu Kha's father, Abul Hossain (alias Monu Khan), was a farm laborer. Roshu Kha was from Modna village in the Chandra Union of Chandpur Sadar Upazila.

== Criminal life ==
After being arrested, Roshu Kha told police during interrogation that he had loved a girl before marriage. As a consequence of this affair, the girl's brothers broke his arm. To avenge this humiliation, he vowed revenge. He decided to kill 101 people to take his revenge. After committing those 101 murders, he planned to renounce the world and live a pious life, wandering from shrine to shrine as a saint. Roshu Kha used to build romantic relationships with women. After gaining their trust, he would rape and murder them. His killing spree began in 2007 with the murder of Rina, the wife of his brother-in-law Mannan. He lured her to Bhatiyalpur in the Faridganj police station area of Chandpur District under false pretenses. There, he raped her and then strangled her to death, leaving her body by the bank of the Dakatia River. One by one, he went on to commit ten more murders. His final victim was a woman named Parvin, whom he raped and killed on July 20, 2009, by a canal in Hasa village under Faridganj police station, along with his nephew Zahirul and their accomplice Yunus. Roshu Kha was also involved in various crimes in the Dhaka and Gazipur areas. Apart from murder, he engaged in mugging, robbery, home invasions, bombings, and other terrorist activities—though theft remained his primary occupation. Eventually, in 2022, Roshu Kha was released in connection with a kidnapping case.

== Arrest ==
Between 2007 and 2009, police from the Faridganj Police Station in Chandpur district recovered the bodies of six unidentified women. Each of the victims had been raped before being murdered. In July 2009, police recovered the body of a woman named Parvin. Following that incident, a man called the officer-in-charge of Faridganj Police Station from a mobile number and stated that he had transported the woman named Parvin by rickshaw from the bus stand. He mentioned the names of two young men, claiming that they had raped and murdered her. During the call, the man identified himself to the officer-in-charge as "Babul". After receiving the phone complaint, police arrested the two named individuals. But after investigation, they were found not to be involved in Parvin's rape. When police attempted to call back the number, it was found to be switched off. To trace the number, the police employed a female informant. After a month, the informant informed the police that the number had become active again. Upon contacting it, police learned that the SIM card had been purchased from a sugarcane vendor named Tajul in the Gazipur market of Paikpara South Union in Faridganj Upazila, Chandpur district. When police detained Tajul, he revealed that two men named Roshu Kha and Mizan had attempted to steal a fan from a mosque, at which point he and a night guard had caught them red-handed. At that time, he took the SIM card from Roshu Kha and later sold it for 100 taka. Roshu Kha had been jailed for the fan theft but was released on bail. The police then confirmed that it was Roshu Kha who had made the phone call. From there, they launched a mission to arrest him. On October 7, 2009, he was arrested from Mirashpara in Tongi, Gazipur. Following his arrest, police began interrogating him. Though initially silent, he later confessed to murdering Parvin. After that, one by one, he gave confessional statements admitting to killing ten more women. A total of 11 cases were filed against him. After being arrested, he admitted that he was a professional criminal and had been involved in various kinds of crimes. He even attempted suicide once after his arrest.

== Cases ==
=== Poppy murder case ===
On February 9, 2009, police recovered the body of a young woman named Poppy from a canal in Noyarhat, Chandpur District. Roshu Kha confessed to the murder of Poppy to the police. However, in court, he was proven innocent. Judge Robiul Hasan of the Chittagong Divisional Speedy Trial Tribunal acquitted him of all charges in the Poppy murder case.

=== Shahida murder case ===
On December 17, 2008, Roshu Kha confessed to killing Shahida by the bank of the Dakatia River in Sobhanpur, Chandpur Sadar Upazila. On April 22, 2015, Judge Arunava Chakraborty, Additional District and Sessions Judge of Chandpur, sentenced Roshu Kha to death in the Shahida murder case.

=== Parvin murder case ===
On March 6, 2018, Judge Abdul Mannan of the Women and Children Court in Chandpur sentenced Roshu Kha, along with his nephew Zahirul and their accomplice Yunus, to death in the Parvin murder case.

== Personal life ==
Roshu Kha was married to two women. Before his first marriage, the matchmaker did not allow him to see the bride beforehand. His first wife Moni was blind in one eye. Without divorcing his first wife, he married her sister Rina. After marrying Rina, he began living in Tongi, Gazipur.

== See also ==
- List of serial killers by country
