= Rupsha Zamindar Bari =

Coordinates: 23°08′01″N 90°47′08″E

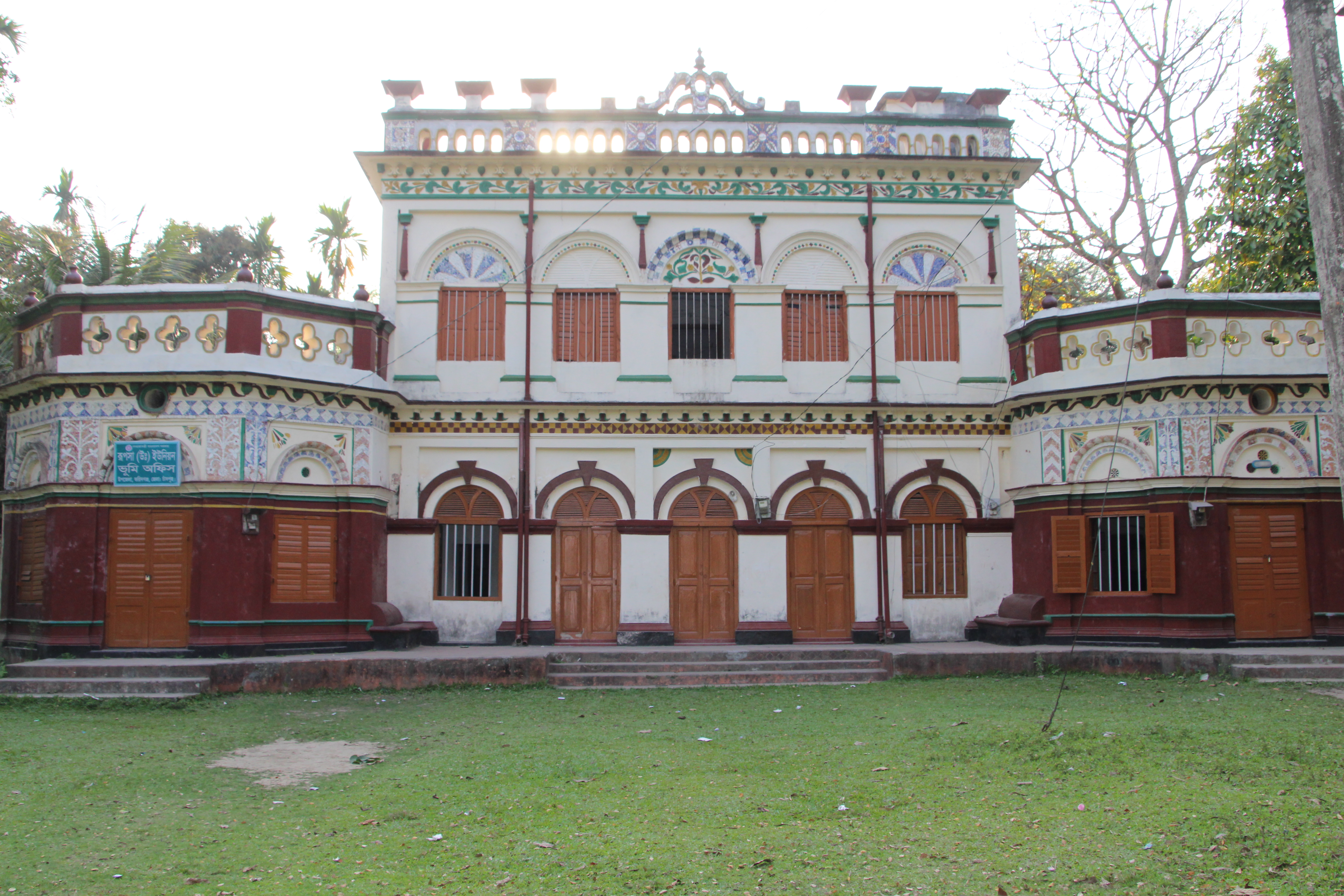
- Interactive map of the Rupsha Zamindar Bari area

General information
- Type: Residential mansion
- Location: Faridganj Upazila, Chandpur District, Bangladesh
- Completed: Mid-18th century
- Closed: Mid-19th century
- Owner: Ahmad Raja Chowdhury

Rupsha Zamindar Bari (Bengali: রূপসা জমিদার বাড়ি) is a historic zamindar estate located in Faridganj Upazila in Chandpur District, Bangladesh.

== History ==
Around 250 years ago, after the decline of Hindu zamindars in Banshal village (now Khajuria), a Muslim landlord purchased the zamindari rights from the British and established Rupsha Zamindar Bari. There are differing views on the original founder of the estate. One belief credits Ahmad Raja, while another attributes it to Mohammad Gazi. However, the more widely accepted version holds that Ahmad Raja was the founder and that Mohammad Gazi was his son. After Ahmad Raja's death, Mohammad Gazi inherited the zamindari, followed by his own son Ahmed Gazi.

The zamindars of Rupsha were known for their kindness and never oppressed their tenants for revenue collection. In fact, they were known to help their subjects in times of hardship, earning their deep respect—an admiration that still exists today. One notable figure from the family was Khan Bahadur Abidur Reza Chowdhury, a renowned politician and social worker during the British period. Descendants of the Rupsha Zamindar family still reside in the estate.

== Architecture ==
In front of the estate lies a large open field. There are three main brick buildings: the central mansion, one to its left, and another at the rear. Additionally, there are three tin-roofed houses. To the right of the main entrance stands a mosque and the family graveyard.

== Current condition ==
Unlike many other zamindar houses in Bangladesh that have decayed due to neglect, the Rupsha Zamindar Bari remains relatively well-preserved. The entrance still features a gate, and inside are a mosque, a family graveyard, and a former office room (kachari ghar).

== Gallery ==
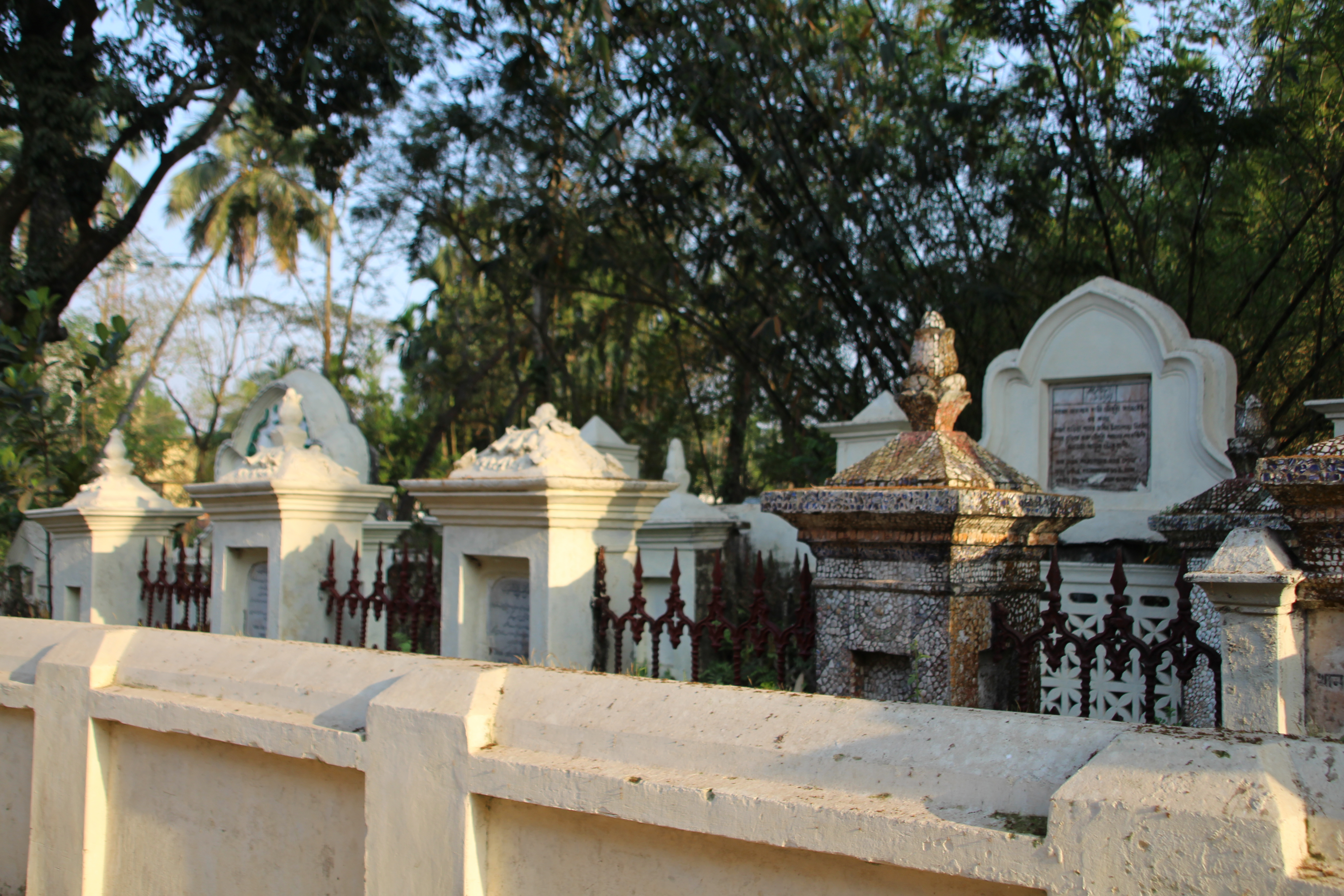
Zamindar family graveyard

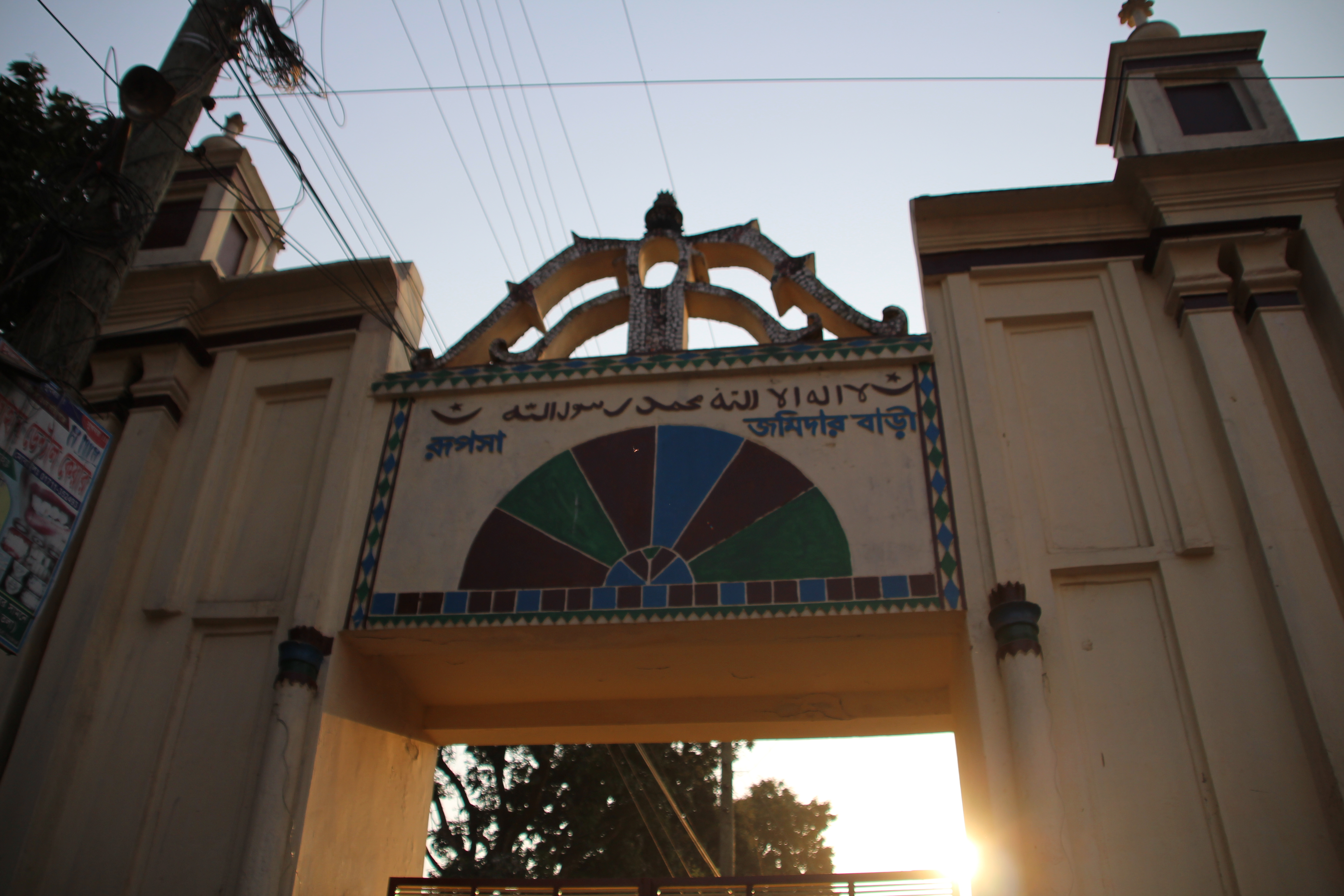
Entrance

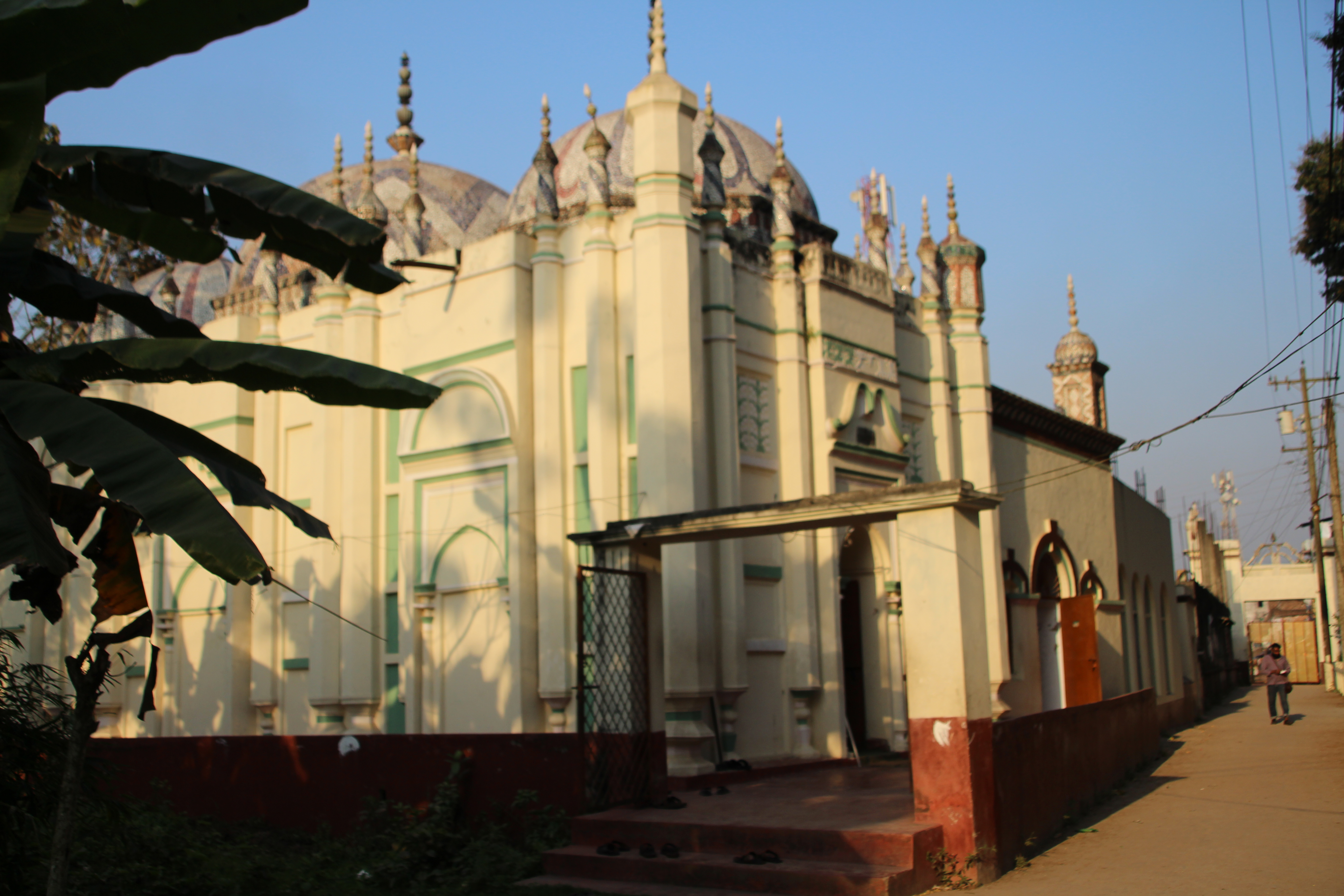
Zamindar Estate Mosque
