= Chandpur-3 =

Constituency of Bangladesh's Jatiya Sangsad

Coordinates: 23.23°N 90.67°E

- Constituency for the Jatiya Sangsad
- District: Chandpur District
- Division: Chittagong Division
- Electorate: 430,400 (2018)

Current constituency
- Created: 1984
- Party: Bangladesh Nationalist Party
- Member: Sheikh Farid Ahmed Manik
- ← 261 Chandpur-2 263 Chandpur-4 →

Chandpur-3 is a constituency represented in the Jatiya Sangsad (National Parliament) of Bangladesh since 2026 by Sheikh Farid Ahmed Manik of the Bangladesh Nationalist Party.

== Boundaries ==
The constituency encompasses Chandpur Sadar and Haimchar upazilas.

== History ==
The constituency was created in 1984 from a Comilla constituency when the former Comilla District was split into three districts: Brahmanbaria, Comilla, and Chandpur.

Ahead of the 2008 general election, the Election Commission redrew constituency boundaries to reflect population changes in light of the 2001 Bangladesh census. The 2008 redistricting altered the boundaries of the constituency.

== Members of Parliament ==
Election	Member	Party
1986	Harunur Rashid Khan	Jatiya Party
1988	Harunur Rashid Khan	Jatiya Party
1991	Alam Khan	Bangladesh Nationalist Party
Jun 1996	G. M. Fazlul Haque	Bangladesh Nationalist Party
2001	G. M. Fazlul Haque	Bangladesh Nationalist Party
2008	Dipu Moni	Awami League
2014	Dipu Moni	Awami League
2018	Dipu Moni	Awami League
2024	Dipu Moni	Awami League
2026	Sheikh Farid Ahmed Manik	Bangladesh Nationalist Party

== Elections ==
=== Elections in the 2010s ===
Dipu Moni was re-elected unopposed in the 2014 general election after 18 parties led by the Bangladesh Nationalist Party boycotted the election citing unfair conditions for the election.

=== Elections in the 2000s ===
General Election 2008: Chandpur-3
Party	Candidate	Votes	%	±%
AL	Dipu Moni	134,836	52.2	+13.9
BNP	G. M. Fazlul Haque	116,068	45.0	−13.9
IAB	Md. Nurul Amin	4,474	1.7	N/A
BSD	Shajahan Talukder	1,363	0.5	N/A
Gano Forum	Selim Akbar	518	0.2	N/A
BTF	Mizanur Rahman	430	0.2	N/A
BKA	Md. Hossain Akhand	267	0.1	N/A
Gano Front	Hafiz Masud Akhter	118	0.1	N/A
Majority		18,768	7.3	−13.3
Turnout		258,074	82.8	+20.5
AL gain from BNP				

General Election 2001: Chandpur-3
Party	Candidate	Votes	%	±%
BNP	G. M. Fazlul Haque	72,830	58.9	+19.3
AL	Shamsul Haq Bhuiyan	47,324	38.3	+5.7
IJOF	Mizanur Rahman	3,009	2.4	N/A
Independent	Alam Khan	338	0.3	−3.6
Independent	Sabur Khan	217	0.2	N/A
Majority		25,506	20.6	+13.6
Turnout		123,718	62.3	−6.0
BNP hold				

=== Elections in the 1990s ===
General Election June 1996: Chandpur-3
Party	Candidate	Votes	%	±%
BNP	G. M. Fazlul Haque	39,415	39.6	−4.5
AL	AB Siddique	32,419	32.6	+6.3
JP(E)	Harunur Rashid Khan	15,977	16.1	+3.1
Jamaat	Md. Abdur Rob	6,285	6.3	−7.3
Independent	Alam Khan	3,851	3.9	N/A
Zaker Party	Md. Abdus Samad	757	0.8	N/A
Independent	Md. Zakaria	514	0.5	N/A
Islamic Sashantantrik Andolan	Md. Jahangir Alam Khan	186	0.2	N/A
Bangladesh Bekar Samaj	Md. Shafiqul Islam Patwan	77	0.1	N/A
Majority		6,996	7.0	−10.8
Turnout		99,481	68.3	+24.8
BNP hold				

General Election 1991: Chandpur-3
Party	Candidate	Votes	%	±%
BNP	Alam Khan	38,162	44.1	
AL	Md. Riasat Ullah	22,747	26.3	
Jamaat	Md. Abdur Rob	11,781	13.6	
JP(E)	Harunur Rashid Khan	11,253	13.0	
JSD	H. M. Gias Uddin	1,089	1.3	
JSD (S)	Md. Khorshed Alam	619	0.7	
Bangladesh People's League(Garib A Nawaz)	Md. Siddiqur Rahman Hazra	254	0.3	
Independent	Ali Ashraf Patowari	251	0.3	
NAP (Muzaffar)	Shahid Ullah	196	0.2	
Jatiya Samajtantrik Dal-JSD	Wali Ahmed Patowari	184	0.2	
Majority		15,415	17.8	
Turnout		86,536	43.5	
BNP gain from JP(E)				
