= Masjid-e-Noor (Rupsha Zamindar Bari) =

Mosque in Chandpur, Bangladesh

Coordinates: 23°8′2.2″N 90°47′11.7″E

- মসজিদে নূর
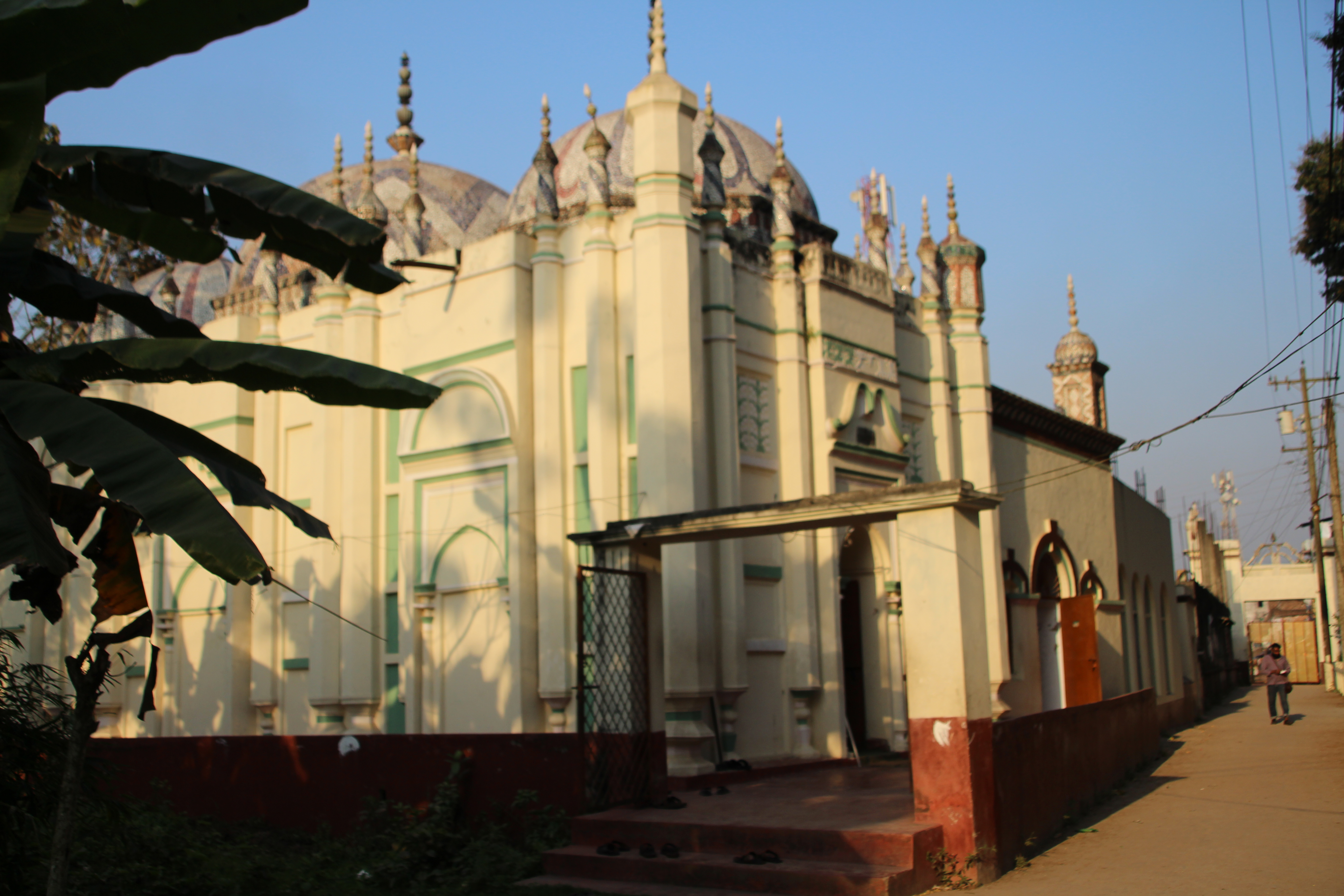

Religion
- Affiliation: Islam
- District: Chandpur District
- Ownership: Muhammad Gazi Chowdhury Foundation
- Status: Active

Location
- Location: Rupsha Bazar, Rupsha Zamindar Bari, Faridganj Upazila
- Country: Bangladesh
- Interactive map of Masjid-e-Noor

Architecture
- Funded by: Rupsha Zamindar Bari
- Established: 1284 Bengali calendar 1877-78 AD
- Construction cost: 20,000 Rupees

Specifications
- Capacity: 500
- Length: 47 Feet
- Width: 40 Feet
- Dome: 39

Masjid-e-Noor (Bengali: মসজিদে নূর) is a congregational mosque established in 1284 of the Bengali year. The mosque is located in Rupsa North Union of Faridganj Upazila, in the Rupsha Bazar area, at the boundary of the zamindar house, next to the family cemetery of the zamindar house. Since it was built by the Rupsha zamindar, it is more commonly known as the Rupsha Zamindar Estate Mosque. It was constructed at the initiative of Mohammad Ghazi Chowdhury at a cost of twenty thousand rupees. Over time, the mosque has been expanded three times. Currently, a foundation formed in the name of the mosque's founder manages the mosque.

== Infrastructure ==
In terms of length and width, the prayer hall of the mosque is 47 by 40 feet. Including the boundary, the mosque covers an area of 53x30 feet, which includes a spacious courtyard, accommodating additional people during Friday prayers and Ramadan. A long pond with a stepped ghat on the western side is used for ablution. Due to population growth, the main building of the mosque has been expanded three times.

== Architecture ==
Masjid-e-Noor is built in the Islamic architectural style. The mosque has a total of forty-nine domes on its roof, including three large domes. In addition to four minarets at the four corners of the roof, there are several smaller minarets. The domes and minarets are adorned with various designs carved in delicate marble stonework. There are three mihrabs on the qibla-facing wall. Additionally, the main mosque has several archways, each of which is decorated.

Next to the entrance, there is a white marble plaque with the construction date and the name of the builder inscribed in Persian.

== Capacity ==
Inside the main mosque, 500 people can pray together. During Friday prayers and Ramadan, an additional two to three hundred worshippers regularly attend.
