= Arjumand Ali =

Bengali writer (1870–1930)

Arjumand Ali Chowdhury
- আর্জুমন্দ আলী
- Born: Arjuman Ali Chowdhury; 1870; East Bhadeshwar, Golapganj, Sylhet District
- Died: 1930 (aged 59–60); Rupsa, Tippera District, Bengal Province
- Resting place: Rupsa, Faridganj, Chandpur District, Bangladesh
- Occupation: Writer
- Relatives: Abidur Reza Chowdhury (brother-in-law)
- Writing career
- Language: Bengali
- Notable works: Premdarpaṇ, Hriday Sangīt

Arjumand Ali Chowdhury (Bengali: আর্জুমন্দ আলী চৌধুরী; 1870–1930), better known as simply Arjumand Ali, was a blind Bengali author and poet during the British Raj. The customary style of Bengali literature had historically been through poetry (puthis), with prose literature only emerging in the 19th century. Ali's Premdarpaṇ is the earliest example of a prose novel from Bengal's Muslim community.

== Early and personal life ==
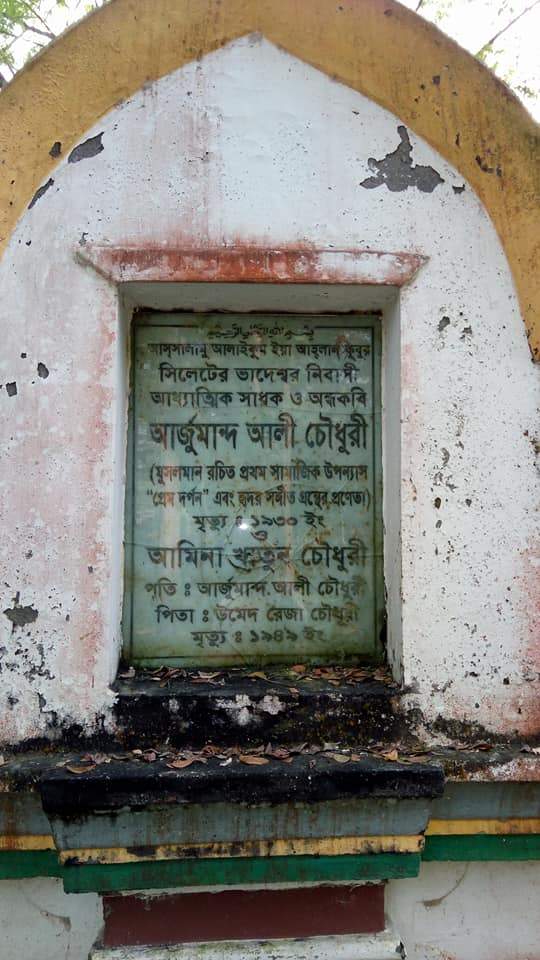
The tombstone of Arjumand Ali and his wife, Amina Khatun Chowdhurani.

Ali was born in 1870, to a Bengali Muslim family of Chowdhuries in eastern Bhadeshwar, Golapganj, located in the Sylhet District of Assam Province. Through his father, Bande Ali Chowdhury, he was a descendant of the medieval Baro-Bhuiyan chieftain Fateh Khan. From an early age, Ali was described to have been a lover of poetry and a deep thinker. He married Amina Khatun Chowdhurani, the daughter of the Zamindar of Rupsha Umed Reza Chowdhury and Syeda Aftabunnesa Chowdhurani. His brother-in-law was Khan Bahadur Abidur Reza Chowdhury. Ali was blind.

== Work ==
After passing matriculation in 1890, Ali left education and found employment as a school inspector. In 1891, he wrote Premdarpaṇ, which is recognised as the first Bengali prose novel written by a Muslim. The novel was a love story between a Muslim boy and Hindu girl, as well as Ali's personal sorrows. Ali claimed that the novel was based on a true incident. His poetry anthology was published in 1905, with the title Hriday Sangīt.

== Death ==
Ali died in 1930 and had no children. He was buried in the Rupsa zamindar family graveyard in Faridganj, Chandpur District, and a mazar (mausoleum) was constructed around his grave.

== See also ==
- Asaddor Ali
