= Tarpurchandi =

Village in Tapurchandi Union, Chandpur Sadar Upazila

Coordinates: 23.2475°N 90.6672°E

Tarpurchandi is a village in Tarpurchandi Union of Chandpur Sadar Upazila, Chandpur District, Bangladesh. It is situated near the town of Chandpur.
