= Sheikh Farid Ahmed Manik =

Bangladeshi politician (born 1965)

Member of the Bangladesh Parliament for Chandpur-3
- Incumbent
- Assumed office February 16, 2026
- Preceded by: Dipu Moni

Personal details
- Born: 1 June 1965 (age 61) Chandpur, East Pakistan
- Party: Bangladesh Nationalist Party
- Occupation: Businessman
- Website: skfaridahmed.info.bd

Sheikh Farid Ahmed Manik (born 1 June 1965) is a Bangladeshi politician and a member of the Bangladesh Nationalist Party (BNP). He was elected as a member of parliament from the Chandpur-3 constituency in the 2026 Bangladesh general election. He is the president of BNP, Chandpur District unit since 2023 and secretary of overseas welfare, central committee of BNP. He is the managing director of Silkways Group.

== Early life and education ==
Manik was born on 1 June 1965 in Chandpur District. His father’s name is Sheikh Mamtaz Uddin and his mother’s name is Begum Rowshan Akter. He completed his graduation from the University of Dhaka.

== Career ==
He is a businessman and he has been actively involved in politics. Since 2023, he has been serving as the president of the BNP Chandpur District unit. He is also the secretary of overseas welfare in the central committee of BNP.

Before this, he worked as the general secretary and later as the convener of the BNP Chandpur District unit.
