= Alam Khan =

Alam Khan may refer to:

- Alam Khan (composer) (1943–2022), Bangladeshi composer and music director
- Alam Khan (actor) (born 1999), Indian actor, model and dancer
- Alam Khan (politician), Bangladeshi politician
