= Aburkandi =

Aburkandi আবুরকান্দি
- Location in Bangladesh
- Coordinates: 23°26′N 90°40′E
- Country: Bangladesh
- Division: Chittagong Division
- District: Chandpur District
- Time zone: UTC+6 (Bangladesh Time)

Aburkandi (Bengali: আবুরকান্দি) is a village in Chandpur District in the Chittagong Division of central-eastern Bangladesh.
