= Amena Begum =

- Born: 1925; Faridganj village, Faridganj Upazila, Chandpur District, Bengal Presidency, British India
- Died: April 7, 1989 (aged 63–64); Dhaka, Bangladesh
- Occupation: Politician

Amena Begum (1925 – 7 April 1989), a former member of parliament of East Pakistan, was a Bangladeshi politician. She was instrumental in campaigning all over East Pakistan for the Six Point program of regional autonomy drafted by the Awami League, and on 7 June 1966, organized the general strike along with Mizanur Rahman Chowdhury. This strike was observed throughout the then East Pakistan and was the first major indication that an independent Bangladesh was imminent. She later took over as president of the Jatiya League. She died in Dhaka on 7 April 1989.
