= Shantanu Kaiser =

Bangladeshi poet and essayist

- শান্তনু কায়সার
- Born: 30 December 1954; Faridganj Upazila, Chandpur District, East Bengal, Dominion of Pakistan
- Died: 11 April 2017 (aged 62); Dhaka, Bangladesh
- Resting place: Chandpur, Bangladesh
- Education: University of Dhaka

Shantanu Kaiser (30 December 1954 – 11 April 2017) was a Bangladeshi poet and essayist. He was awarded Bangla Academy Literary Award (2014) in the essay category.

== Early life and career ==
Kaiser earned his master's degree in English from the University of Dhaka.

Kaiser published 45 books.

== Works ==
Kaiser published his first volume of poetry, Rakhaler Attochorit, in 1982. His second book Shuvo Shubornojoyonti was published in 2002. He wrote several books on the biography of the writer Adwaita Mallabarman including "Adwaita Mallabarman" (1987), "Adwaita Mallabarman: Jiban, Shahitya Ebong Onynyo" (1998) and "Janmashatabarshe Adwaita Mallabarman: Jiban, Shahitya O Shanshkriti" (2014). He edited Mallabarman's "Uponyassamagra" and "Titash Ekti Nadir Naam". He adapted "Titash Ekti Nadir Naam" into a play. He wrote two books "Ful o Nazrul" and "Oi Nutoner Keton Ore" based on the works of poet Kazi Nazrul Islam.
