= Dipu Moni =

Former Social Welfare Minister of Bangladesh

- দীপু মনি
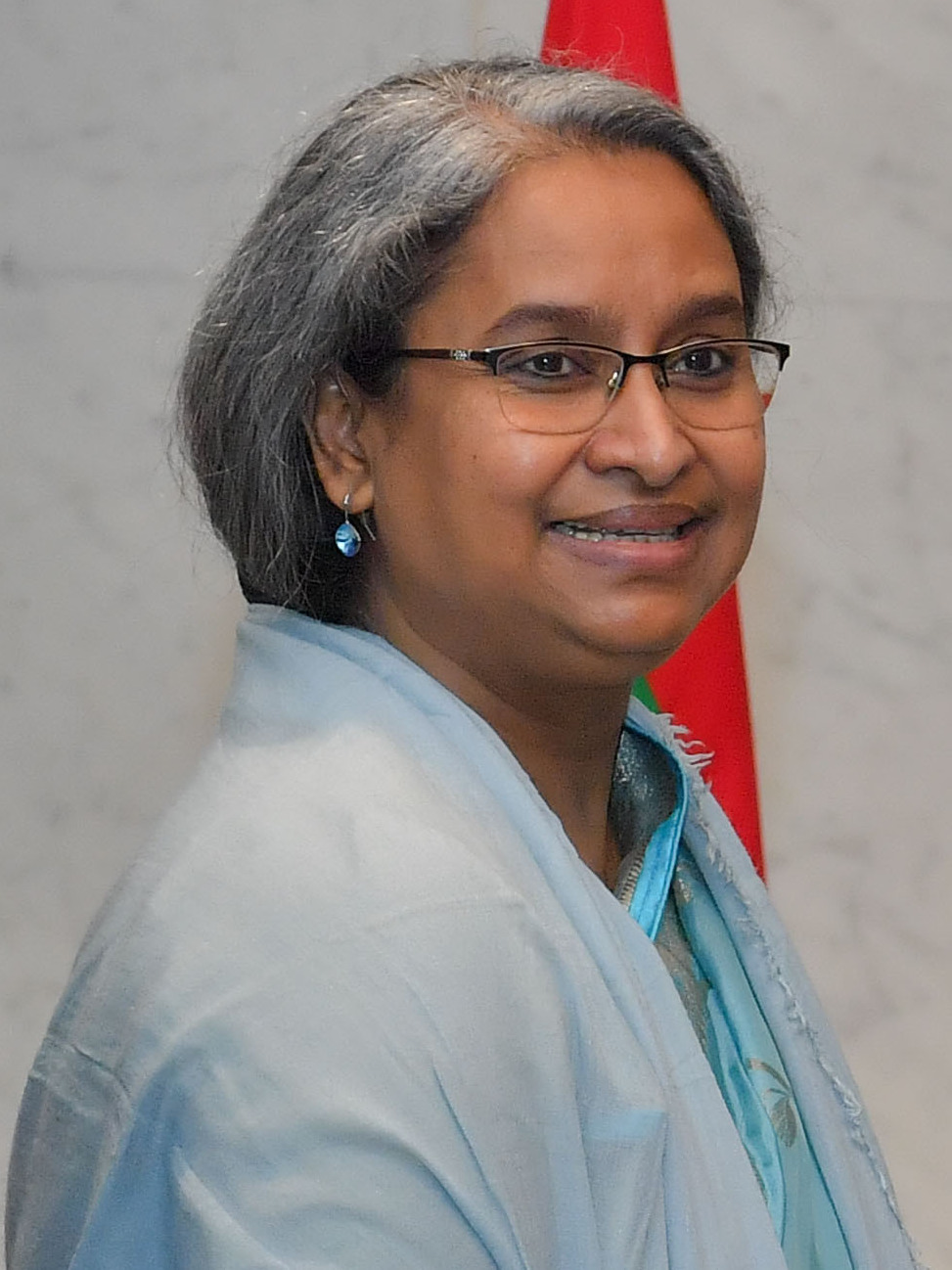
- Moni in 2021

Minister of Social Welfare
- In office 11 January 2024 – 6 August 2024
- Prime Minister: Sheikh Hasina
- Preceded by: Nuruzzaman Ahmed
- Succeeded by: Sharmeen Murshid

Member of the Bangladesh Parliament for Chandpur-3
- In office 25 January 2009 – 6 August 2024
- Preceded by: G. M. Fazlul Haque
- Succeeded by: Sheikh Farid Ahmed Manik

Minister of Education
- In office 7 January 2019 – 11 January 2024
- Prime Minister: Sheikh Hasina
- Preceded by: Nurul Islam Nahid
- Succeeded by: Mohibul Hasan Chowdhury

Minister of Foreign Affairs
- In office 30 January 2009 – 20 November 2013
- Prime Minister: Sheikh Hasina
- Preceded by: Iftekhar Ahmed Chowdhury
- Succeeded by: Abul Hassan Mahmud Ali

Personal details
- Born: 8 December 1965 (age 60) Chandpur, East Pakistan, Dominion of Pakistan
- Party: Bangladesh Awami League
- Spouse: Tawfique Nawaz
- Children: 2
- Parent: MA Wadud (father)
- Education: Dhaka Medical College; National University; Johns Hopkins University; University of London
- Profession: Politician, doctor and lawyer

Dipu Moni (born 8 December 1965) is a Bangladeshi politician. She was a Jatiya Sangsad member representing the Chandpur-3 constituency for four terms. She was minister of education in the fourth Hasina ministry and minister of foreign affairs in the second Hasina ministry. She was appointed as the first female minister of foreign affairs of Bangladesh on 6 January 2009, serving until 2013. Currently, she is the joint secretary of the Bangladesh Awami League. She then served as the minister of social welfare.

== Early life ==
Dipu Moni was born on 8 December 1965 in the village of Kamranga in Chandpur in then East Pakistan (now Bangladesh). Her father, Mohammad Abdul Wadud, was a founding member of the Awami League and known especially for his role in the Language Movement and as the first Council-elected General Secretary of the East Pakistan Chhatra League. Her mother, Begum Rahima, was a teacher. Her brother, Jawadur Rahim Wadud Tipu, is a diabetic foot surgeon.

Moni passed HSC from Holy Cross College, Dhaka. She studied MBBS at Dhaka Medical College Hospital and LLB at Bangladesh National University. She later earned a master's in public health at Johns Hopkins Bloomberg School of Public Health, and Master of Laws at the University of London as an external student. She completed a course on negotiations and conflict resolutions from Harvard University. She is a lawyer of Supreme Court of Bangladesh.

== Political career ==
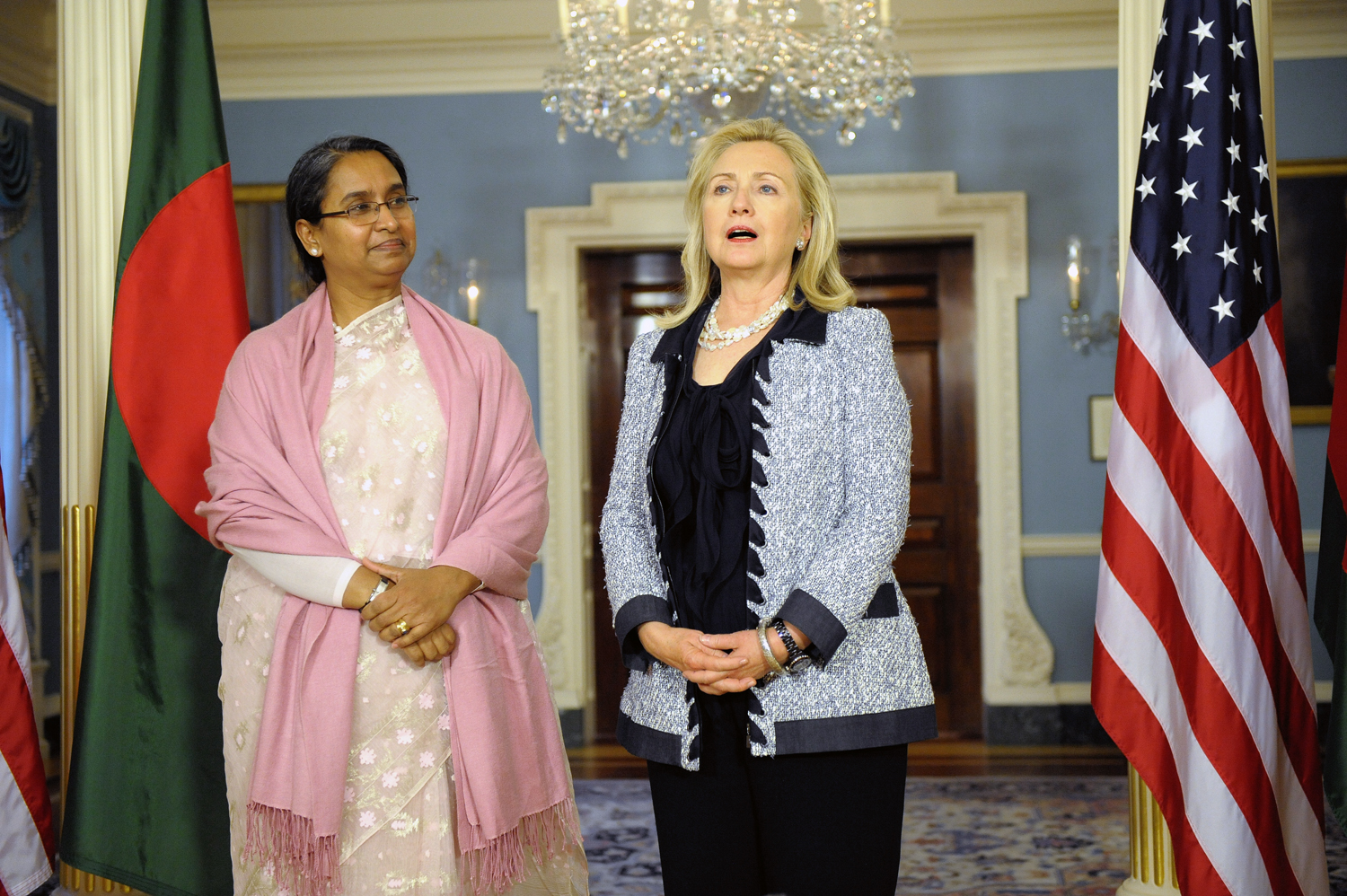
Moni with Hillary Clinton

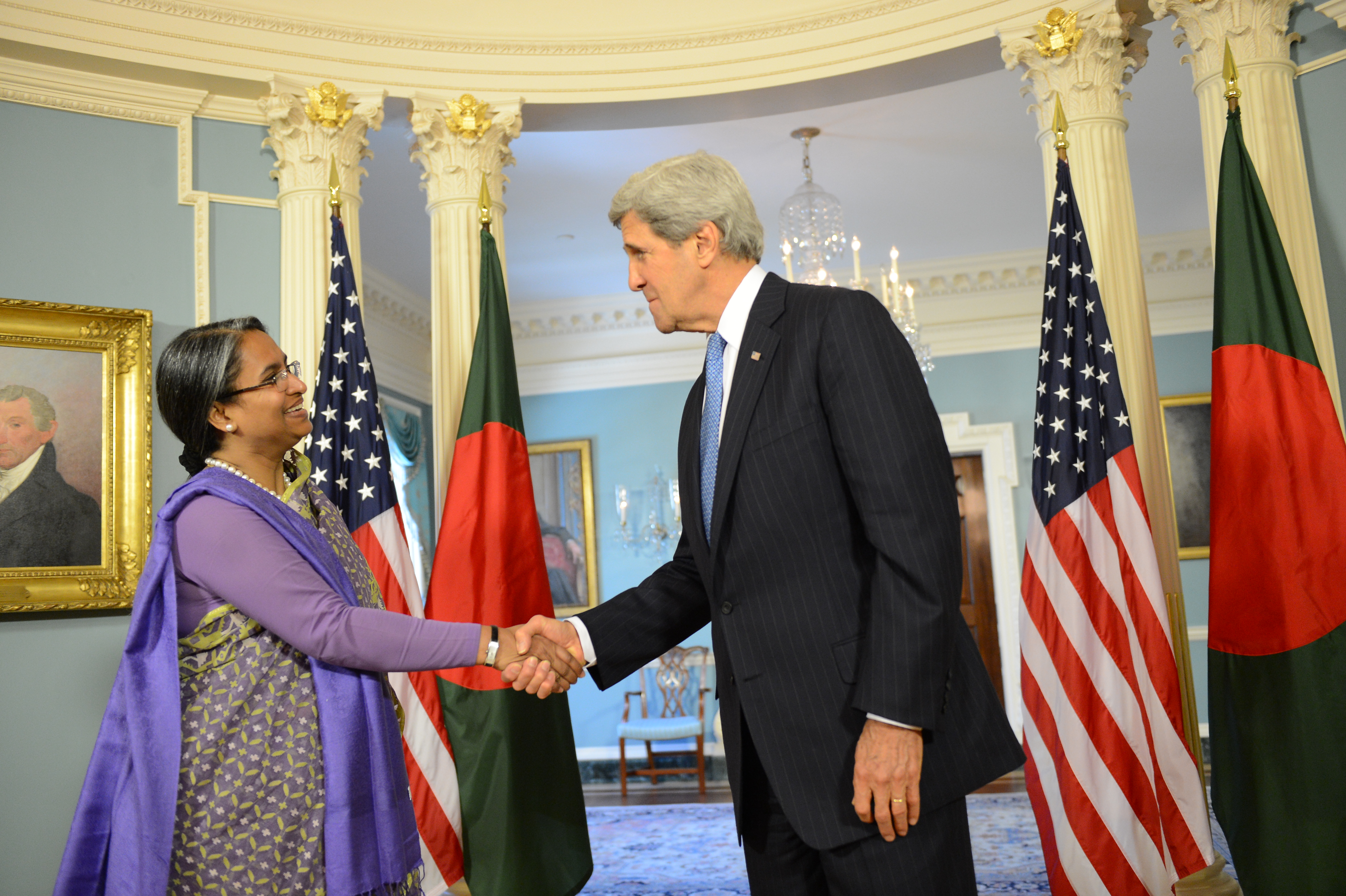
Moni meeting John Kerry

Moni was the secretary for women's affairs and a member of the sub‐committee on foreign affairs of the Bangladesh Awami League before her induction to the cabinet. She represented Chandpur-3 as a member of the Bangladesh Parliament.

Moni was the secretary for women's affairs and a member of the sub‐committee on foreign affairs of the Bangladesh Awami League before her induction to the cabinet.

Moni worked for women's rights and entitlements, health legislation, health policy and management, health financing, strategic planning, and health and human rights under the Constitution and law in Bangladesh's economic and social development programmes and foreign policy issues of the region and globally.

As a minister of foreign affairs she has represented her government's position to the cabinet ministers and public representatives of Asia, Europe and the US, ambassadors and senior representatives of international institutions. As the foreign minister she sought an apology for the 1971 Bangladesh genocide from Pakistan. She also tried to bring the absconding killers of president Sheikh Mujib. Moni is the Awami League joint general secretary. She was elected chairman of Asian University for Women in 2016. She was the chairperson of the parliamentary committee on foreign affairs in the last parliament.

During the 2024 Bangladesh quota reform movement, Moni stated that "Those who introduce themselves as Razakars have no right to hold the blood-stained red and green flag of our Liberation War martyrs or to march with that flag tied to their foreheads".

== Criticisms ==
=== Overseas visits ===
As the minister of foreign affairs, Moni was widely criticized by different news media because of her frequent overseas visits. According to some news reports, she made 187 foreign trips and 600 days of overseas stay in four and a half years. Moni responded that she went abroad every time with the approval of the prime minister. She said that she made 114 foreign tours, including 36 with the president and the prime minister and claimed that the number of her bilateral visits was 62, not 17 as reported.

=== Corruption allegations, increase of wealth ===
According to affidavits submitted to the election office, since the Awami League party came to power in 2008, her personal net worth has increased by over 4,000% in 15 years. On 19 August 2024, the Daily Star reported that Moni was being investigated on alleged corruption allegations.

=== Illegal sand extraction ===
On 25 October 2023, The Daily Star reported an investigation into illegal sand mining in Chandpur, raising concerns over Moni's alleged involvement in supporting the operations of Selim Khan, a local Awami League leader. Reports suggest that Khan, despite facing multiple charges of illegal sand extraction, continued his operations with the help of letters (Demi Official letters) written by Moni between 2015 and 2021 to various government bodies, including the Prime Minister's Office. These letters advocated for Khan's companies to be granted permission for sand extraction, despite a ban in place since 2023. Critics argue that Dipu Moni's political influence enabled Khan to evade legal repercussions and amass significant wealth from these activities. Moni, however, denies any wrongdoing, asserting that her letters were intended to promote legal sand extraction to prevent river erosion.

=== Legal case ===
On 15 August 2024, a case was filed against 510 known and 1,000-1,200 unnamed people affiliated with the Awami League for their alleged involvement in an arson attack on the residence of the district leader of the Bangladesh Nationalist Party in Chandpur on 18 July that included Moni and her brother JR Wadud Tipu. She was subsequently arrested on 19 August. On 20 August, another case was filed against her and her brother for their alleged involvement in an attack on student protesters during the 2024 non-cooperation movement in Chandpur on 4 August.

== Personal life ==
Moni was married to Tawfique Nawaz, a senior advocate of the Appellate Division of the Supreme Court of Bangladesh. She was granted 12-hour parole to attend his funeral on 18 August 2026. Together they had a son, Tawquir Rashaad Nawaz, and a daughter, Tani Dipabali.

Moni's cousin, Xulhaz Mannan, was an LGBTQ+ rights activist, USAID employee, and the founder of Bangladesh's first and only LGBTQ-themed magazine Roopbaan.

Moni's residence in Chandpur was vandalized after the resignation of PM Sheikh Hasina in the 2024 non-cooperation movement. It was burned down on 18 November 2026.
