= Harunur Rashid Khan =

Bangladeshi politician

Member of Bangladesh Parliament
- In office 1983–1991

Personal details
- Died: 2003
- Party: Jatiya Party (Ershad)

Harunur Rashid Khan is a Jatiya Party (Ershad) politician and a former member of parliament from Chandpur-3.

== Career ==
Khan was elected to parliament from Chandpur-3 as a Jatiya Party candidate in 1986 and 1988.
