= Bhadeshwar Union =

Coordinates: 24°46′00″N 92°00′44″E

Bhadeshwar Union ভাদেশ্বর ইউনিয়ন Bhadeshor
- Union Council
- No. 8 Bhadeshwar Union Council
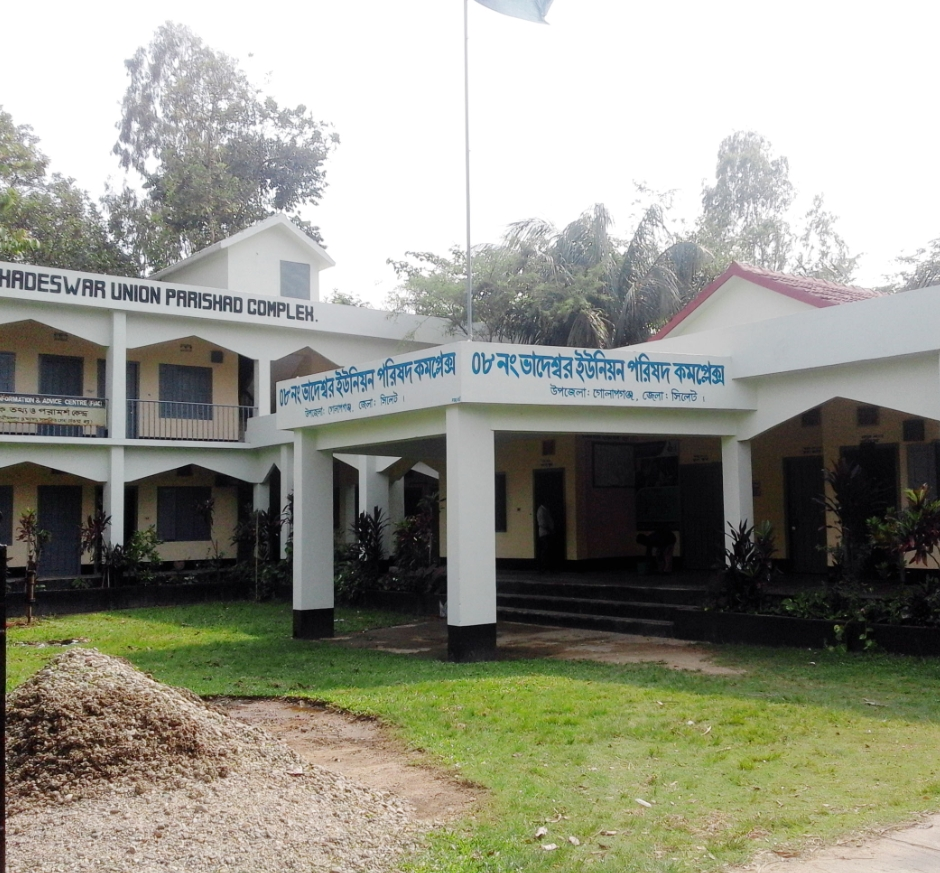
- Bhadeshwar Union Parishad Complex

- Location in Bangladesh
- Country: Bangladesh
- Division: Sylhet Division
- District: Sylhet District
- Upazila: Golapganj Upazila

Government
  - Union Chairman: Shamim Ahmed

Population
  - Total: 50,000
- Demonym: Bhadeshwari
- Time zone: UTC+6 (BST)
- Website: bhadeshwarup.sylhet.gov.bd

Bhadeshwar Union (Bengali: ভাদেশ্বর ইউনিয়ন) is a Union Parishad under Golapganj Upazila of Sylhet District in the division of Sylhet, Bangladesh. It has an area of 33 square kilometres and a population of 50,000.

== History ==
Syed Bahauddin, a disciple of Shah Kamal Quhafah and one of three sons of Shah Jalal's disciple Syed Alauddin, was known to have settled in the village of Bhadeshwar in the 14th century. He is popularly known as Shah Putla and his tomb is present in a mazar (mausoleum) in South Bhadeshwar, on the banks of the Kura river near Maqambazar.

In the 1760s, Sheikh Faizullah was invited to Bhadeshwar by the Zamindars of Dhakauttar and Dhakadakshin after stopping them from being exiled by Ikramullah Khan, the Mughal administrator of Sylhet. Faizullah was the bakhshi (paymaster) of Ikramullah Khan and a descendant of the 14th-century Arab immigrant Sheikh Karam Muhammad. He settled in Bhadeshwar, in an area which came to be known as Sheikhpara (Neighbourhood of the Sheikhs). He had two sons, Sheikh Ghulam Nabi and Sheikh Ghulam Muhammad. The former had three sons, including Sheikh Abdul Ghani. Sheikh Abdul Ghani had five sons, including Sheikh Abdul Manaf. Sheikh Abdul Manaf had five sons, including Sheikh Abdul Hakim, the father of Sheikh Abdur Rahim.

== Geography and climate ==
Bhadeshwar Union is located in the Golapganj Upazila. It borders the Kushiyara River in the east, Ghilachhara and SeikhPur in the west, Dhakadakshin and Lakshanabandh in the north and Sharifganj Union in the south. It has an area of 33 square kilometres.

Bhadeshwar has a typical Bangladesh tropical monsoon climate (Köppen Am) bordering on a humid subtropical climate (Cwa) at higher elevations. The rainy season from April to October is hot and humid with very heavy showers and thunderstorms almost every day, whilst the short dry season from November to February is very warm and fairly clear. Nearly 80% of the annual average rainfall of 4,200 millimetres (170 in) occurs between May and September.

== Administration ==
Bhadeshwar constitutes the no. 8 union council of Golapganj Upazila. It contains 35 villages and 12 mouzas, divided into 9 wards.

- Ward 1: Naliuri, Noorpur, Terapur, Krishnapur, Ujanmeharpur.
- Ward 2: Purbobhag, Fotehkhani, Shingkapon, Rajapur, Silimkhani, Purbobhag Fokirtul, Poshchim Fokirtul, Purbobhag Nowapara.
- Ward 3: Kolashahar, Maijbhag, Silimpur.
- Ward 4: Dargah Dair, Shaykhpara, Dakshinbhag.
- Ward 5: Teraguli, Dokharpara, Morarkiyar, Poshchimbhag.
- Ward 6: Dakshingaon, Uttargaon.
- Ward 7: Shiteshwar, Khomiyapaon, Masura Borobari.
- Ward 8: Gotargaon, Shaykhpur, Goaspur, Kuliya, Niyagul, Katakhaler Par.
- Ward 9: Fatehpur, Haortola.

=== Chairmen ===
List of Union chairmen
| Number | Name | Term |
|---|---|---|
| 01 | Sirajuddin Ahmad Ghani Miah | 24/4/1960 - 28/1/1967 |
| 02 | Numan Uddin Chowdhury | 29/1/1967 - 31/12/1983 |
| Vice-chairman | MA Salik | 1 February 1973 - 31 January 1977 |
| 03 | Fazlul Haq Tanu Mian | 19 January 1984 - 10 May 1985 |
| 04 | Kamar Uddin Chowdhury | 1 October 1985 - 5 October 1988 |
| 05 | Faruq Ahmad | 6 October 1988 - 30 October 1992 |
| 06 | MA Salik | 31 October 1992 - 15 September 2016 |
| 07 | Jilal Uddin | 16 September 2016 – 2021 |
| 08 | Shamim Ahmed | 2021–present |

== Demographics ==
Bhadeshwar has a population of 50,000. 24,800 are male and 25,200 are female. According to the 2011 Bangladesh census, Bhadeshwar had 4,082 households. The literacy rate (age 7 and over) was 75%, compared to the national average of 51.8%.

== Language and culture ==
The native population converse in their native Sylheti dialect but can also converse in Standard Bengali. Languages such as Arabic and English are also taught in schools. The Union contains 56 mosques and 9 eidgahs. The cemeteries are as follows:

1. Shah Syed Bahauddin Putla Qabarstan (near Dakshinbhag Mosque)
2. Shukkur Shah Qabarstan (Pashchimbhag)
3. Manikpirer Tilla (Purbabhag-Kolashohor)

=== Sports ===
There are five sports clubs in the Union. These are: Rongdhonu Cricket (Dakshinbhag), Tringanga Football (Dakshinbhag), Pashchimbhag Volleyball Team, Dakshinbhag Volleyball Team, Muslim Brotherhood (Bhadeshwar). The latter team were champions in the Dhakadakshin-Dattarail Football Tournament with their players; Habib Parvez winning Man of the Match in the finals and Jubayr winning Man of the Series.

== Economy and tourism ==
Bhadeshwar has five Haat bazaars and three banks. The Kura Nodi upper bridge is a well known tourist attraction. The bazaars are as follows:

1. Bhadeshwar Maqaam Bazar in Dakshinbhag
2. Kurir Bazar in Dokharpara
3. Mirganj Bazar in Shaykhpur
4. Purbabhag Bazar

Rice is a major crop in the area. Maqaam Bazar is the town centre situated at the bank of Kuranodi. Maqaam Bazar is famous from freshwater fish and locally produced. Mirganj-Bazar is also in Bhadeshwar, situated at the bank of Kushiyara River. Mirganj Bazar once attracted merchants from all over the subcontinent during the time of Mughal empire. Foreign remittance is a major source of income within the region.

The Union is home to 24 mazar (mausoleum)s. These include:

- Mazar-e-Shah Syed Bahauddin Putla and Mazar-e-Phool Shah, Dakshinbhag
- Mazar-e-Shukkur Shah, Pashchimbhag
- Mazar-e-Qatal Shah, Maijbhag
- Mazar-e-Pir Shah, Pirtillah, Purbabhag-Kolashohor
- Mazar-e-Arkum Shah, Khomiya-Shiteshwar
- Mazar-e-Shah Naqi Ali, Kuti Miyar Deri, Faqirtul
- Mazar-e-Lal Shah, Dokharpara
- Mazar-e-Shodai Shah, Shaykhpur
- Mazar-e-Shah Uthman Ghani Singai, Haortola
- Mazar-e-Asim Shah, Baneshwarpur
- Mazar-e-Shah Tayyab Sair Ali, Chaker Bazar
- Mazar-e-Syed Qutub and Mazar-e-Syed Jalal, Bhangi
- Mazar-e-Shah Sikandar, Shah Sikandarpur
- Mazar-e-Shah Ghazi, Baduhaji
- Mazar-e-Mian Chan Khan, Khatira
- Mazar-e-Mir Mahiuddin, Mirer Chak
- Mazar-e-Shah Sheikh Farid, Faridpur
- Mazar-e-Shah Qutbuddin, Mazar-e-Shah Ziauddin Garam Dewan, Mazar-e-Shah Taqiuddin, Sabdalpur
- Mazar-e-Shah Samoon Sanjari, Qadipur
- Mazar-e-Ilah Shah, Ilahiganj
- Mazar-e-Khani Shah, Purangaon
- Mazar-e-Bhashoman Pathar Shah, Kurigram

== Education ==
The Union has a literacy rate of 75%. It has 23 government primary schools, 2 private primary schools, 4 kindergartens, and one private women's college. There are 13 madrasas (including two Alia Madrasahs and 7 Qawmi Madrasahs).

Bhadeshar was a well-renowned place to study in Assam province during British Raj. Bhadeshwar has some of the oldest schools within the region. Bhadeshwar Purbabhag Primary School is the oldest primary school established in 1818. Bhadeshwar Nasir Uddin High School was once the most renowned High School within the greater Assam. Bhadeshwar Women's College, founded in 1989, received the best educational institute in Bangladesh award in 2002. Salima Khanom Girls High School is another oldest secondary school in the village. It was built by Ghawth Ahmad (1915–1989) in 1938 (officially 1940). He named the school after his mother.

== Notable people ==
- Arjumand Ali, first Bengali Muslim novelist
- Abdul Matin Chaudhary, first Agriculture Minister of Pakistan
