= Chandpur, Bangladesh =

City of Bangladesh in Chattogram Division

Chandpur চাঁদপুর
- City and Municipality
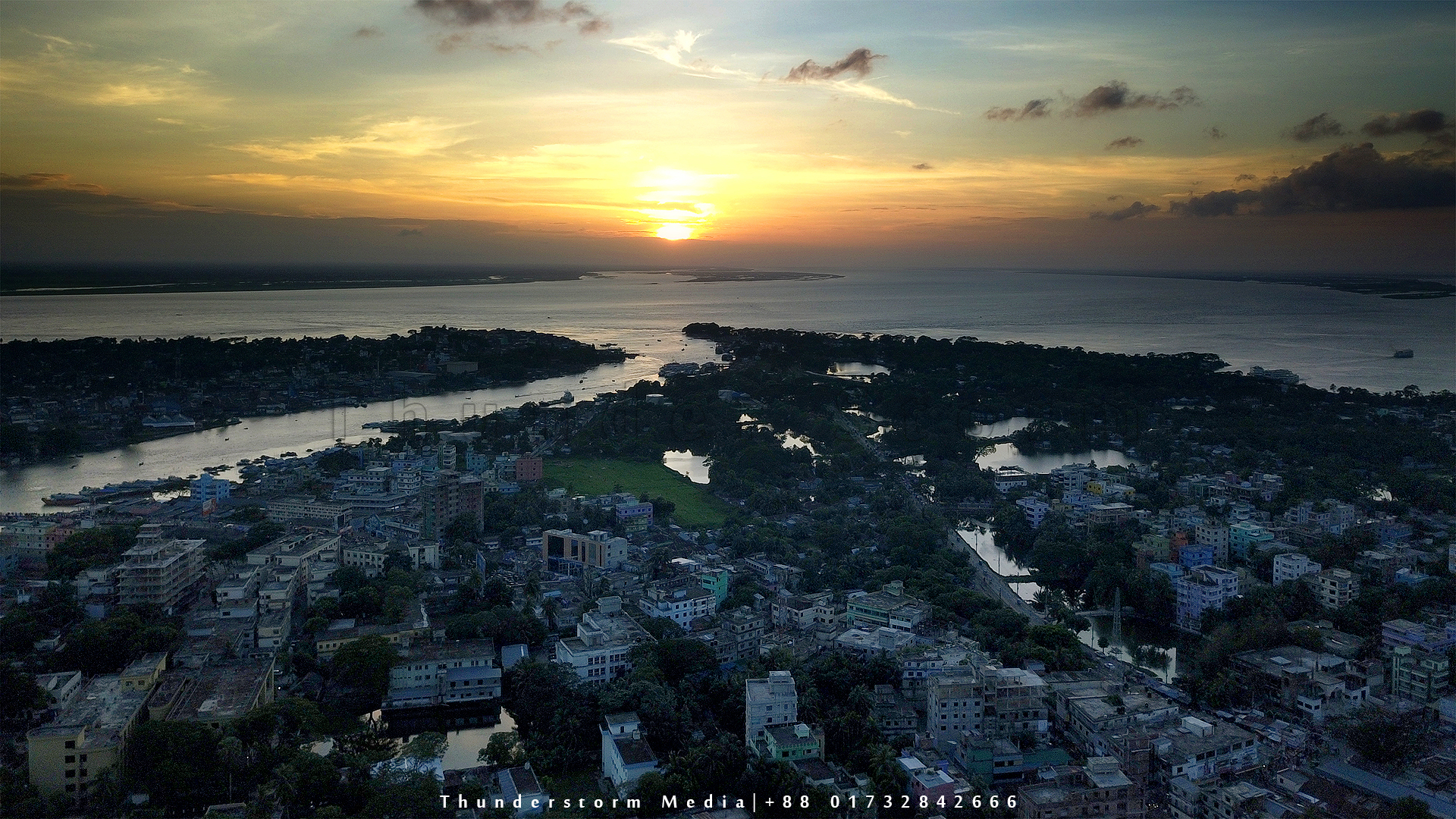
- Nickname: City of Ilish
- Location within Chittagong division Location within Bangladesh
- Coordinates: 23°13′34″N 90°38′56″E
- Country: Bangladesh
- Division: Chittagong
- District: Chandpur
- Upazila: Chandpur Sadar

Government
  - Type: Mayor–Council
  - Body: Chandpur Municipal Corporation

Area
  - Total: 22 km^{2} (8.5 sq mi)

Population (2022)
  - Total: 203,436
  - Density: 9,200/km^{2} (24,000/sq mi)
- Time zone: UTC+6 (Bangladesh Time)
- National Dialing Code: +880

Chandpur is a city and headquarter of Chandpur Sadar Upazila and Chandpur District in Chattogram Division, Bangladesh. It stands near the confluence of the Padma River and the Meghna River. Chandpur city was made a municipality in 1892. About 203,000 people live here which makes this city the 23rd largest city in Bangladesh.

== Demographics ==
Population

Historical population
| Year | Pop. | ±% p.a. |
|---|---|---|
| 1991 | 73,755 | — |
| 2001 | 91,390 | +2.17% |
| 2011 | 159,021 | +5.70% |
| 2022 | 203,451 | +2.27% |

According to the 2022 Bangladesh census, Chandpur Paurashava had 48,494 households and a population of 203,451. Chandpur had a literacy rate of 83.97%: 84.57% for males and 83.39% for females, and a sex ratio of 97.19 males per 100 females. 9.29% of the population was under 5 years of age.

According to the 2011 Bangladesh census, Chandpur city had 33,322 households and a population of 159,021. 34,164 (21.48%) were under 10 years of age. Chandpur had a literacy rate (age 7 and over) of 67.41%, compared to the national average of 51.8%, and a sex ratio of 993 females per 1000 males.

Religions

Religions in Chandpur city (2022)
| Religion | Percent |
| Islam | 90.56% |
| Hinduism | 9.28% |
| Other or not stated | 0.16% |

== Climate ==
Climate data for Chandpur (1991–2020, extremes 1964-present)
| Month | Jan | Feb | Mar | Apr | May | Jun | Jul | Aug | Sep | Oct | Nov | Dec | Year |
|---|---|---|---|---|---|---|---|---|---|---|---|---|---|
| Record high °C (°F) | 31.2 (88.2) | 34.1 (93.4) | 37.8 (100.0) | 40.0 (104.0) | 37.8 (100.0) | 39.7 (103.5) | 37.2 (99.0) | 36.8 (98.2) | 38.2 (100.8) | 36.7 (98.1) | 35.5 (95.9) | 31.7 (89.1) | 40.0 (104.0) |
| Mean daily maximum °C (°F) | 24.5 (76.1) | 28.3 (82.9) | 32.0 (89.6) | 33.5 (92.3) | 33.5 (92.3) | 32.6 (90.7) | 31.8 (89.2) | 32.1 (89.8) | 32.3 (90.1) | 32.0 (89.6) | 29.8 (85.6) | 26.2 (79.2) | 30.7 (87.3) |
| Daily mean °C (°F) | 18.4 (65.1) | 21.9 (71.4) | 26.1 (79.0) | 28.3 (82.9) | 28.9 (84.0) | 29.0 (84.2) | 28.7 (83.7) | 28.8 (83.8) | 28.7 (83.7) | 27.8 (82.0) | 24.4 (75.9) | 20.2 (68.4) | 25.9 (78.6) |
| Mean daily minimum °C (°F) | 13.5 (56.3) | 16.4 (61.5) | 20.9 (69.6) | 23.9 (75.0) | 25.0 (77.0) | 26.1 (79.0) | 26.1 (79.0) | 26.2 (79.2) | 26.0 (78.8) | 24.6 (76.3) | 20.1 (68.2) | 15.7 (60.3) | 22.0 (71.6) |
| Record low °C (°F) | 7.2 (45.0) | 10.3 (50.5) | 14.0 (57.2) | 17.0 (62.6) | 19.7 (67.5) | 21.1 (70.0) | 22.2 (72.0) | 23.5 (74.3) | 22.5 (72.5) | 18.0 (64.4) | 14.3 (57.7) | 10.0 (50.0) | 7.2 (45.0) |
| Average precipitation mm (inches) | 6 (0.2) | 25 (1.0) | 48 (1.9) | 114 (4.5) | 264 (10.4) | 353 (13.9) | 425 (16.7) | 339 (13.3) | 272 (10.7) | 169 (6.7) | 34 (1.3) | 8 (0.3) | 2,061 (81.1) |
| Average precipitation days (≥ 1 mm) | 1 | 2 | 4 | 7 | 13 | 17 | 22 | 21 | 17 | 8 | 2 | 1 | 115 |
| Average relative humidity (%) | 78 | 73 | 73 | 77 | 80 | 85 | 86 | 85 | 85 | 82 | 78 | 78 | 80 |
| Mean monthly sunshine hours | 176.4 | 191.1 | 218.0 | 212.8 | 199.6 | 137.6 | 133.6 | 139.3 | 142.4 | 189.8 | 200.5 | 175.1 | 2,116.2 |
Source 1: NOAA
Source 2: Bangladesh Meteorological Department (humidity 1981–2010)

== See also ==
- Upazilas of Bangladesh
- Districts of Bangladesh
- Divisions of Bangladesh
- Upazila
- Thana
