= MA Wadud =

Bangladeshi language activist and politician

- মোহম্মদ আব্দুল ওয়াদুদ
- Born: 1 August 1925; Chandpur, Bengal Presidency, British India
- Died: 28 August 1983 (aged 58); Dhaka, Bangladesh
- Occupation: Politician
- Children: Dipu Moni

Mohammad Abdul Wadud (1 August 1925 – 28 August 1983), known as MA Wadud, was a Bangladeshi language activist and politician. He was one of the founding members of Awami Muslim League (later Bangladesh Awami League). He was awarded Ekushey Padak in 2013 posthumously by the government of Bangladesh for his involvement in Bengali language movement in 1952. He is the father of former minister Dipu Moni.

== Early life ==
Mohammad Abdul Wadud was born on 1 August 1925 to a Bengali Muslim family in the village of Rarhir Char in Chandpur, Tipperah district, Bengal Presidency (now Bangladesh).

== Political career ==
Wadud was the founder member of the Gonotrantik Jubo League in 1948, East Pakistan Muslim League in 1948, East Pakistan Awami Muslim League in 1949, Weekly Ittefaq in 1949, The Daily Ittefaq in 1953 and Kendrio Kachi Kachar Mela in 1956.

Wadud was imprisoned for involvement in the language movement in 1948 and 1952 and again for refusing the charge of the ministry of military government in 1978.

Wadud was the general secretary of the student political organization East Pakistan Chhatra League from 1953 to 1954.

== Personal life ==
Mohammad Abdul Wadud was married to Hamida Wadud Poly, a daughter of Khadijah Hossain Lily who was a sister of former President Sheikh Mujibur Rahman. Wadud's daughter Dipu Moni is a doctor, a politician and a former minister of the government of Bangladesh. His son Jawadur Rahim Wadud Tipu is a diabetic foot surgeon.
