= Achalchhila =

Achalchhila আচলছিলা
- Location in Bangladesh
- Coordinates: 23°19′31″N 90°45′31″E
- Country: Bangladesh
- Division: Chittagong Division
- District: Chandpur District
- Time zone: UTC+6 (Bangladesh Time)

Achalchhila (Bengali: আচলছিলা) is a village in Chandpur District in the Chittagong Division of eastern Bangladesh.
