= Abidur Reza Chowdhury =

Bengali politician (1872–1961)

Khan Bahadur Moulvi Abidur Reza Chowdhury
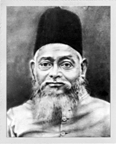

Member of the Bengal Legislative Assembly
- In office 1937–1947
- Constituency: Chandpur West

President of the Tippera Muslim League
- In office 1935–1958

Chairman of the Tippera District Board
- In office 1930–1959

Chairman of the Chandpur Local Board
- In office 1920–1940

Personal details
- Born: 1872 Faridganj, Tipperah District, Bengal Presidency
- Died: 16 January 1961 (aged 88–89)
- Party: All-India Muslim League
- Relatives: Arjumand Ali (brother-in-law)
- Awards: Khan Bahadur (1930); Tamgha-i-Khidmat (1954)

Khan Bahadur Abidur Reza Chowdhury (Bengali: আবিদুর রেজা চৌধুরী; 1872 - 16 January 1961) was a Bengali politician and philanthropist. He was one of the founding members of the All-India Muslim League. The present-day Cumilla District Board auditorium is named after him.

== Early life and education ==
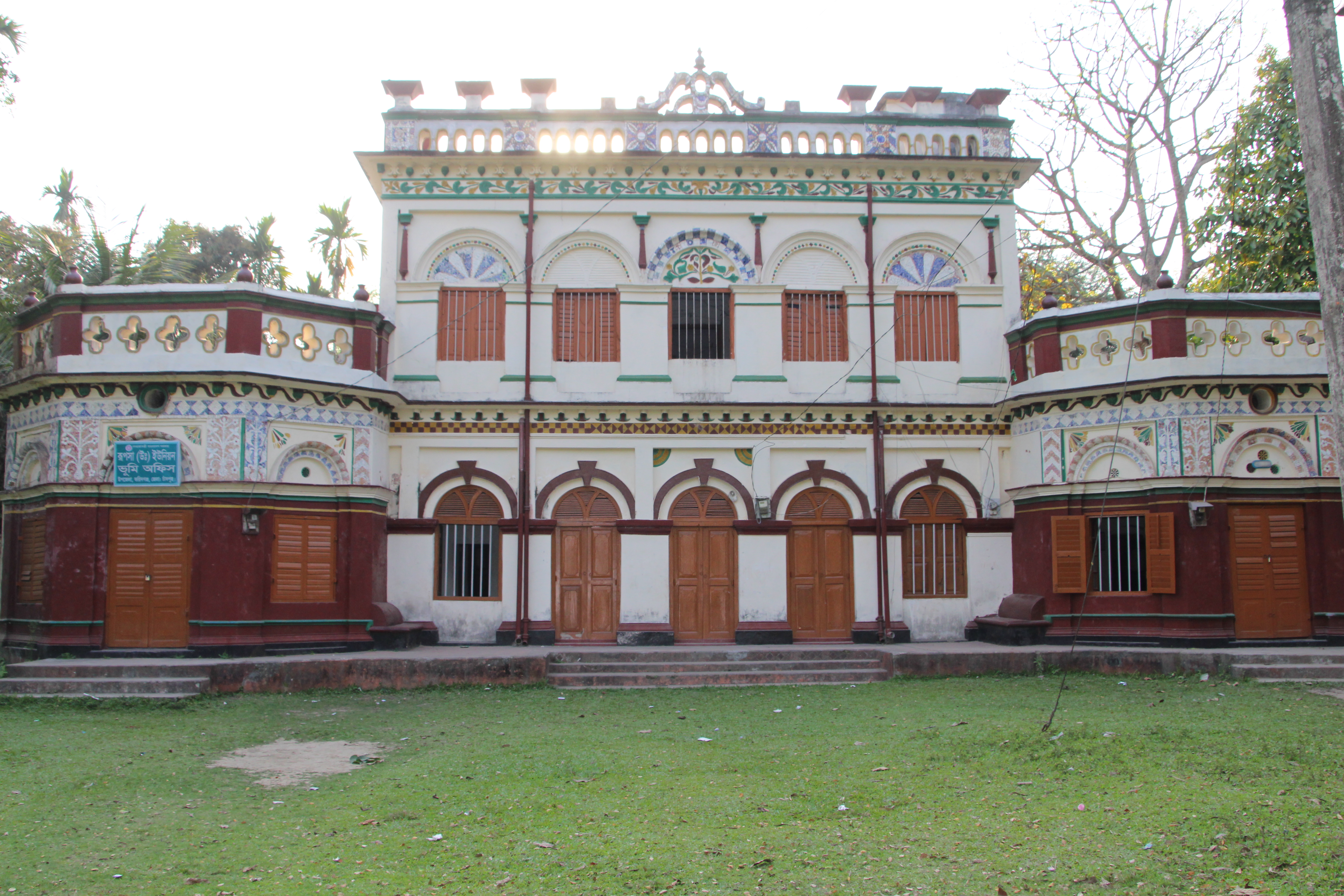
The Rupsha zamindar palace in Faridganj.

Chowdhury was born in 1872 to a Bengali Muslim family known as the Zamindars of Rupsha in the village of Rupsha-Singhergaon, Faridganj, Chandpur, part of the erstwhile Tipperah District of the Bengal Presidency. His father was Umed Reza Chowdhury, the former Zamindar of Rupsha, and the zamindari was founded by their ancestor Ahmad Raja. Chowdhury's mother, Syeda Aftabunnesa Chowdhurani, was the daughter of Syed Badshah Alam of Rajganj in Noakhali. His maternal family were descendants of the Sufi military general Syed Sher Alam of Baghdad, who was said to be a descendant of Ali, the fourth Caliph of Islam.

His sister, Amina Khatun Chowdhurani, was married to Arjumand Ali of Sylhet, the first Bengali Muslim novelist. Due to poor health, he could not get formal education in his childhood. He was therefore homeschooled, and grew a great interest in education.

== Career ==
Chowdhury's political career began when he was elected as the chairman of the Chandpur Local Board in 1920. He was elected several times consecutively, and served as chairman of the Chandpur Local Board until 1940. In 1930, he was elected as the chairman of the Tippera District Board, which covered Brahmanbaria, Chandpur, and Tippera subdivisions. He again was elected several times consecutively in this position too, serving until 1959. On 16 May 1958, his silver jubilee was celebrated in Comilla. Chowdhury was also a longtime chairman of the All-Bengal District Board Chairman Association, which covered all the districts of the Bengal Presidency.

He was invited to the All India Muhammadan Educational Conference in 1906, which was hosted by the Nawab of Dhaka Khwaja Salimullah in Shahbag, and thus became a founding member of the All-India Muslim League. Chowdhury was a longtime member of the Bengal Provincial Muslim League's working committee and served as the president of its Tippera branch from 1935 to 1958. In 1937, he contested in the 1937 Bengal legislative elections as a Muslim League candidate and won a seat in the Chandpur West constituency. During the campaign in January, he hosted Muhammad Ali Jinnah in Comilla in front of 40 thousand people, and Jinnah was said to have stated that it was the largest reception that he attended in Bengal. He preserved his seat for a second term following the 1946 legislative elections.

Among his other positions were the chairmanship of the Tippera School Board and membership at the Dacca University Court. He established numerous schools, including Abidur Reza Pilot Model High School in Faridganj and the Rupsha Primary School.

== Awards ==
The British Raj conferred the title of Khan Bahadur on him during the 1930 New Year Honours. Chowdhury later renounced this award in 1946 to protest the treatment of South Asian Muslims by the colonial regime. The government of Pakistan issued him a Tamgha-i-Khidmat in 1954.

== Death ==
Chowdhury died on 16 January 1961, in Rupsha.
