= Abul Kalam Azad (businessman) =

Bangladeshi businessman

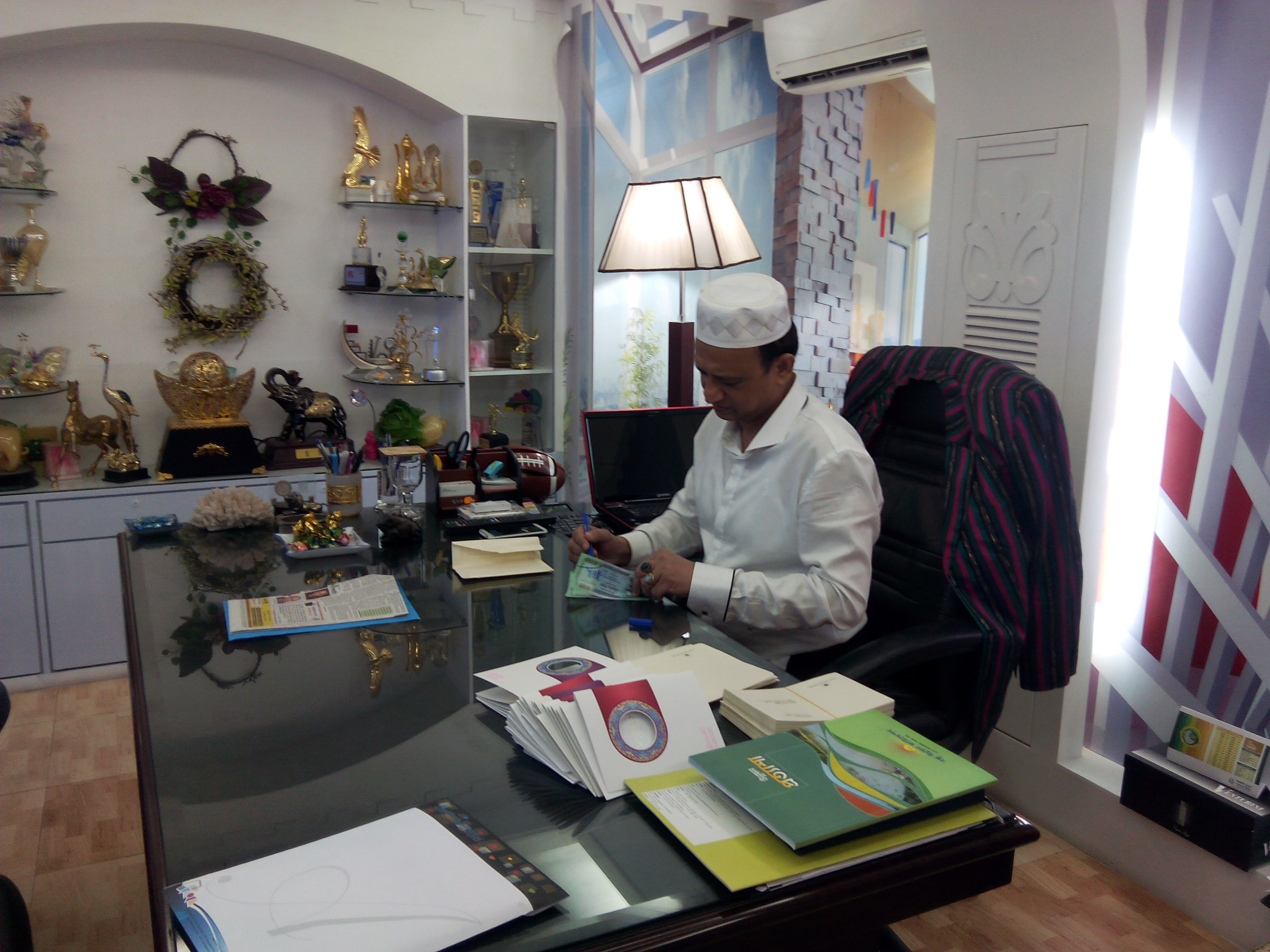
Azad at his office, Dhaka 2014

Abul Kalam Azad is a Bangladeshi businessman, founder and managing director of Azad Products, who was the president of the Bangladesh Printing Product Association.

== Early life ==
Azad was born Chandpur District and was raised in Shariatpur District. He worked in Dhaka as a lodging tutor.

== Career ==
Azad started his business by buying posters from Old Dhaka and selling them on the streets in 1982. He expanded the business, called Azad Products, by importing pinups of popular TV shows, such as The Bionic Woman, and footballers from Singapore and selling them in Bangladesh. In the 1990s he started using local celebrities more and with the profit he built Azad Centre in Paltan.

Azad expanded the company to create greeting cards and calendars. He became the president of the Bangladesh Printing Product Association. He also opened branches of Azad Products in different parts of Bangladesh. He established the annual 'Ratnagarva' award for exceptional mothers in 2003. In 2006, Banglalink created a television advertisement based on his biography.

The COVID-19 Pandemic in Bangladesh had been particularly difficult for Azad and his business. He had to close stores following declining demands.

== Controversy ==
Azad was arrested on 29 August 2009 after Inspector Golam Sarwar, of the Criminal Investigation Department, filled a case against him for allegedly assaulting him. The inspector had gone to Azad for a job for his brother. Azad was remanded for a day and his company issued a statement denying the allegations.
