= Kaus Mia =

Bangladeshi businessman (1931–2024)

Md Kaus Mia
- Born: 26 August 1931; Chandpur District, British India
- Died: 25 June 2024 (aged 92); Dhaka, Bangladesh
- Occupations: Businessman; shop owner
- Years active: 1950–2024

Md Kaus Mia (Bengali: কাউছ মিয়া; 26 August 1931 – 25 June 2024) was a Bangladeshi tycoon known for his long-term tax payment record and his work popularizing processed chewing tobacco. He founded Kaus Tobacco Industries and launched the Hakim Pury Zarda chewing tobacco brand.

Mia started as a small shopkeeper in Chandpur at the age of 19 after borrowing money from his mother. Over the decades, he ventured into trading and manufacturing businesses including real estate, shipping, chemicals and tobacco. In 1967, while Bangladesh was part of Pakistan, Mia was recognized by authorities as the top taxpayer in the region—a notable achievement for a self-made businessman.

In independent Bangladesh, Mia consistently received National Tax Card awards from the National Board of Revenue (NBR) for over a decade, being named the best taxpayer in the business category for 15 consecutive years. As per news reports, he credited his tax compliance to a sense of national duty.

As of 2021, he reportedly had a net worth of around Tk10,000 crore (৳100 billion, ~$1 billion). Mia died on 25 June 2024, at the age of 92.

== Early life and education ==
Kaus Mia was born in 1931 in Chandpur region of British India (now Bangladesh). His father was a landowner. Mia studied up to 8th grade but dropped out because World War II disrupted schools. Despite his father's wishes, Mia refused to resume school and pursued business ventures instead.

== Business career ==
=== Early trading and shops ===
In 1950, 19-year-old Mia borrowed money from his mother to open a stationery supplies shop in Chandpur. Over the next decade, he expanded to own five more shops selling items like stationery, cosmetics and general merchandise. He became a licensed agent for cigarette, biscuit and soap brands. By the 1960s, he was elected leader of the local Chandpur trader's association.

=== Tobacco industry ===
In the 1970s, after separating from his brother's businesses, Mia relocated to Narayanganj city. He entered the tobacco sector, stockpiling tobacco leaves during a 1978 national shortage which he then sold for sizeable profits. The same year, Mia established Kaus Tobacco Industries and began manufacturing chewing tobacco under brands like Shanti Pury Zarda, Hakim Pury Zarda and Manik Zarda.

=== Other businesses ===
In addition to tobacco over the decades, Mia started and invested in over 40 types of businesses including real estate, shipping, chemicals, food manufacturing and other sectors with a current focus on tobacco. He owned minority stakes in 16 cargo vessels operating in Bangladesh according to company statements.

== Tax payment record ==
Mia first paid taxes in 1958 while living in Chandpur. In 1967, during East Pakistan governance, provincial authorities named Mia the top taxpayer in the region. In independent Bangladesh as well, Mia consistently received National Tax Card awards from the National Board of Revenue (NBR) for over a decade, being named the best taxpayer in the business category for 15 consecutive years as of 2023.

According to tax authority data, Mia paid between Tk 45–50 crore in annual taxes on his various business ventures and personal income.

== Awards ==
For his business success and tax contributions, Mia was recognized with awards:

- Best Taxpayer in East Pakistan (1967)
- National Tax Card from Bangladesh (2008–2022)
- Best Taxpayer of Mujib Year (2020)
- Kar Bahadur Tax Award (2016–2017)
