= Alam Khan (politician) =

Bangladeshi politician

Member of Bangladesh Parliament
- In office 1991–1996

Personal details
- Political party: Bangladesh Nationalist Party

Alam Khan is a Bangladesh Nationalist Party (BNP) politician and a former member of parliament from the Chandpur-3 constituency.

== Career ==
Khan was elected to parliament from Chandpur-3 as a BNP candidate in 1991.
