= G. M. Fazlul Haque =

Bangladeshi politician (1942/1943–2026)

- জি এম ফজলুল হক

Member of Bangladesh Parliament
- In office 1996–2001
- Preceded by: Alam Khan
- Succeeded by: G. M. Fazlul Haque
- In office 2001–2006
- Preceded by: G. M. Fazlul Haque
- Succeeded by: Dipu Moni

Personal details
- Born: 1942 or 1943
- Died: 17 March 2026 (aged 83) Dhaka, Bangladesh
- Party: Bangladesh Nationalist Party

G. M. Fazlul Haque (Bengali: জি এম ফজলুল হক; 1942 or 1943 – 17 March 2026) was a Bangladesh Nationalist Party (BNP) politician who was a member of parliament for Chandpur-3.

== Life and career ==
Haque was elected to parliament from the Chandpur-3 constituency as a BNP candidate in 2001.

Haque died in Dhaka on 17 March 2026, at the age of 83.
