= Humayun Kabir Dhali =

Dhali, Humayun Kabir
- Born: Chandpur
- Occupations: writer, journalist
- Spouse: Bubly
- Children: Anika, Atashi & Annoy

Humayun Kabir Dhali (Bengali: হুমায়ুন কবীর ঢালী) is an author and journalist from Bangladesh.

Dhali has written 100 up fiction and non-fiction stories, novels and children's books.

Dhali's first book, Mon Shudu mon Chuyesay, a love story, was published in 1991. Dusta Cheler Galpo is also a well-known Kishor novel.

Dhali's other novels including Tomar chokher jall, Dusta Cheler Galpo, 'Tiye Pakhir Janmadinay', 'Ekatturer Militari Voot', 'Kaker Cha kongkaboti', 'Katush Kutush', Lejkata Bugh o Rajkonna, Neel Graher Rohossho, Ek Jay chilo Hunggor, Bilay Nengti, Kalo Murti Rohossho, PitaPutra, Bilai Maw Kata Khow, 'Desh Bdesh er Rupkatha', and 'Rupkothar Rupmohol'.

Dhali's children's book Tiye Pakhir Janmadinay's, (On the Birthday of a Parrot) has been included in the curriculum of Keben primary school, Turkey. His another children book Cowboy and a Magic Mango Tree has been included in the curriculum of 9th State primary school of Yannitsa, Greece. His science fiction book Neel Graher Rohossho has published by Nirmal Book Agency, Kolkata, India.

== Book List ==
- একাত্তরের মিলিটারি ভূত [Ekatturer Military Voot]
- নীলগ্রহের রহস্য [Neel Groher Rohosya]
- কালোমূর্তি রহস্য [Kalomurti Rohosya]
- দুষ্টু ছেলের গল্প [Dusto Chheler Golpo]
- কিশোরসমগ্র [Kishoresomogro]
- টিয়ে পাখির জন্মদিনে [Tiye Pakhir Jonmodiney]
- ক্লাসমেট [Classmate]
- এক যে ছিল হাঙ্গর [Ek Je Chhilo Hangor]
- পরিকন্যা [Porikonya]
- লজিংবাড়ি [Lojingbari]
- জার্নি টু তাজমহল [Journey to Tajmohol, Travel Novel]
- ট্রেন টু কোরাপুট [Train To Koraput, Travel story]
- তোমার চোখের জল [Tomar Chokher Jol]
- আয় ফিরে যাই [Aai Firey jai]
- শহর দেখতে গিয়ে [Shohor dekhte giye]
- কাকছানার বন্ধু মুরগিছানা [kaakchanar Bondhu Murgichana]
- রঙিন সকাল [Rongin Sokal]

== Awards ==
- Atish Dipankar Gold Medal
- Meena Award 2012 by UNICEF
- Chokh Sahitya Award 2013, West Bengal, Kolkata
- M Nurul Kadir Shishusahitya Puruskar, 2013
- Kobi Sangsad Bangladesh Shishusahitya Puruskar
- Kobi Abu Jafar Ubaidullah Gold Medal
- Children & Women Foundation Medal
- Nawab Faijunnesa Gold Medal, 2008
- Salehin Memorial Award
- Lokchhora Foundation Sonmanona
- Podokhkhep Award, 2014
- Sahitya Diganta Writer Award 2017
- Nikhil varat Sahitya Sanmanana, Tripura 2019
- Lekhalekhi Award, Odisha 2019
- South Asian Writers & Journalist Award, NewYork 2021
- Charjapod ShishuSahity Award 2022
- Srot Literary Award, Tripura 2023
