= Bakharpur Mosque =

Mosque in Bakharpur, Chandpur, Bangladesh

- বাখরপুর জামে মসজিদ

Religion
- Affiliation: Islam

Location
- Location: Bakharpur, Chandpur, Bangladesh
- Interactive map of Bakharpur Mosque
- Coordinates: 23.1326°N 90.6516°E

Architecture
- Type: Mosque
- Style: Mughal architecture
- Completed: c. 16th century
- Materials: Lime-surki, brick

Bakharpur Mosque (Bengali: বাখরপুর মসজিদ), also known as the Bakharpur Jame Mosque (বাখরপুর জামে মসজিদ), is a historic mosque located in the village of Bakharpur in Sadar Upazila, Chandpur District, Bangladesh. It is locally referred to as the Ghaibi Mosque (গায়েবি মসজিদ).

== Architecture ==
Although the exact year of construction is not known, the mosque is believed to have been built during the Mughal period. The structure is made of lime-surki and brick, featuring three domes and star-shaped motifs.

The mosque is surrounded by 28 lime-surki pillars, and its walls are approximately 3.25 feet thick. It has five doorways, two mihrabs, and two large structural beams that help maintain its stability.

== Expansion ==
Due to a lack of space for worshippers, a one-story extension was built on a five-story foundation on the mosque's eastern side around 30 years ago. Currently, the entire complex spans 28 decimals (approximately 1.13 acres), comprising the original mosque (6 decimals), the extension (8 decimals), and the Eidgah and pond (14 decimals).

== Significance ==
The mosque holds cultural and religious significance for the local community and draws visitors and history enthusiasts from various regions.

== See also ==
- List of mosques in Bangladesh
- Mughal architecture
