= Chandpur Sadar Upazila =

Upazila in Chittagong Division, Bangladesh

Chandpur Sadar চাঁদপুর সদর
- Upazila
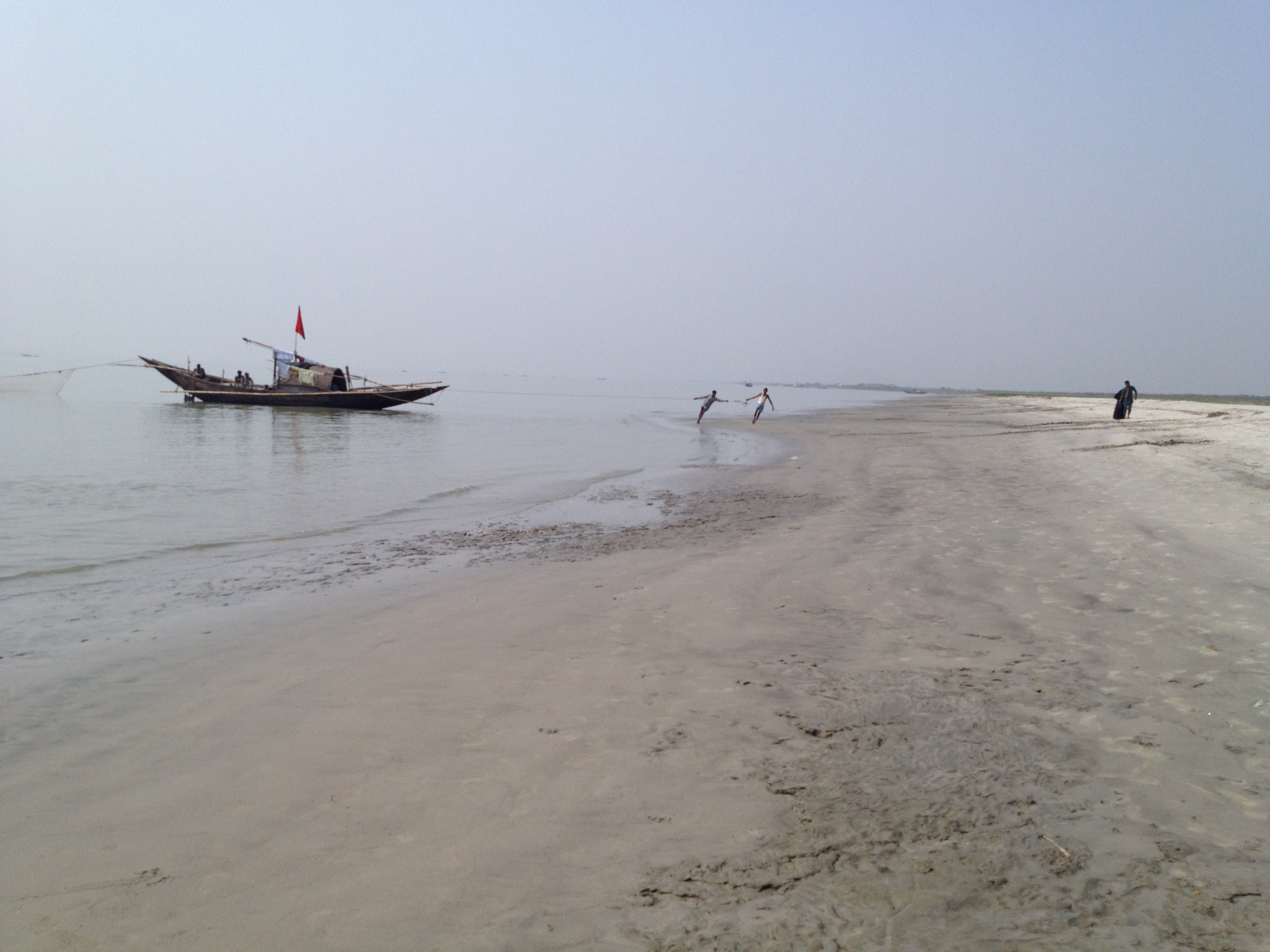
- Balir Char, Chandpur Sadar

- Coordinates: 23.226°N 90.661°E
- Country: Bangladesh
- Division: Chittagong
- District: Chandpur

Area
  - Total: 308.77 km^{2} (119.22 sq mi)

Population (2022)
  - Total: 534,599
  - Density: 1,731.4/km^{2} (4,484.3/sq mi)
- Time zone: UTC+6 (BST)
- Postal Code: 3600
- Area code: 0841

Chandpur Sadar Upazila mauza geocode map

Chandpur Sadar (Bengali: চাঁদপুর সদর) is an upazila of Chandpur District in Chittagong Division, Bangladesh.

== Demographics ==
Religions in Chandpur Sadar Upazila (2022)
Religion	Percent
Islam	94.49%
Hinduism	5.41%
Other or not stated	0.10%

According to the 2022 Bangladeshi census, Chandpur Sadar Upazila had 127,714 households and a population of 534,599. 9.93% of the population were under 5 years of age. Chandpur Sadar had a literacy rate (age 7 and over) of 79.03%: 79.12% for males and 78.95% for females, and a sex ratio of 93.36 males for every 100 females. 248,594 (46.50%) lived in urban areas.

According to the 2011 Census of Bangladesh, Chandpur Sadar Upazila had 98,109 households and a population of 465,919. 109,940 (23.60%) were under 10 years of age. Chandpur Sadar had a literacy rate (age 7 and over) of 56.05%, compared to the national average of 51.8%, and a sex ratio of 1,053 females per 1,000 males. 171,065 (36.72%) of the inhabitants lived in urban areas.

According to the 2001 Bangladesh census, Chandpur Sadar had 85,062 households and a population of 436,680, of whom 49.84% were female. It had an average literacy rate of 57.12%.

The 1991 census states a population of 396,872, of which only 49.28% were more than 18 years of age, 47.75% were female, and 40.1% literate.

== Points of interest ==
- Bakharpur Mosque is a historic mosque in Bakharpur, Chandra Union.

== Administration ==
Chandpur Sadar Upazila is divided into Chandpur Municipality and 14 union parishads: Ashikati, Baghadi, Balia, Bishnupur, Chandra, Hanar Char, Ibrahimpur, Kalyanpur, Maishadi, Rajrajeshwar, Rampur, Shakhua, Shah Mahmudpur, and Tarpur Chandi. The union parishads are subdivided into 107 mauzas and 112 villages.

Chandpur Municipality is subdivided into 15 wards and 120 mahallas.

== See also ==
- Upazilas of Bangladesh
- Districts of Bangladesh
- Divisions of Bangladesh
- Thanas of Bangladesh
- Administrative geography of Bangladesh
