= Faridganj Upazila =

Faridganj ফরিদগঞ্জ
- Upazila
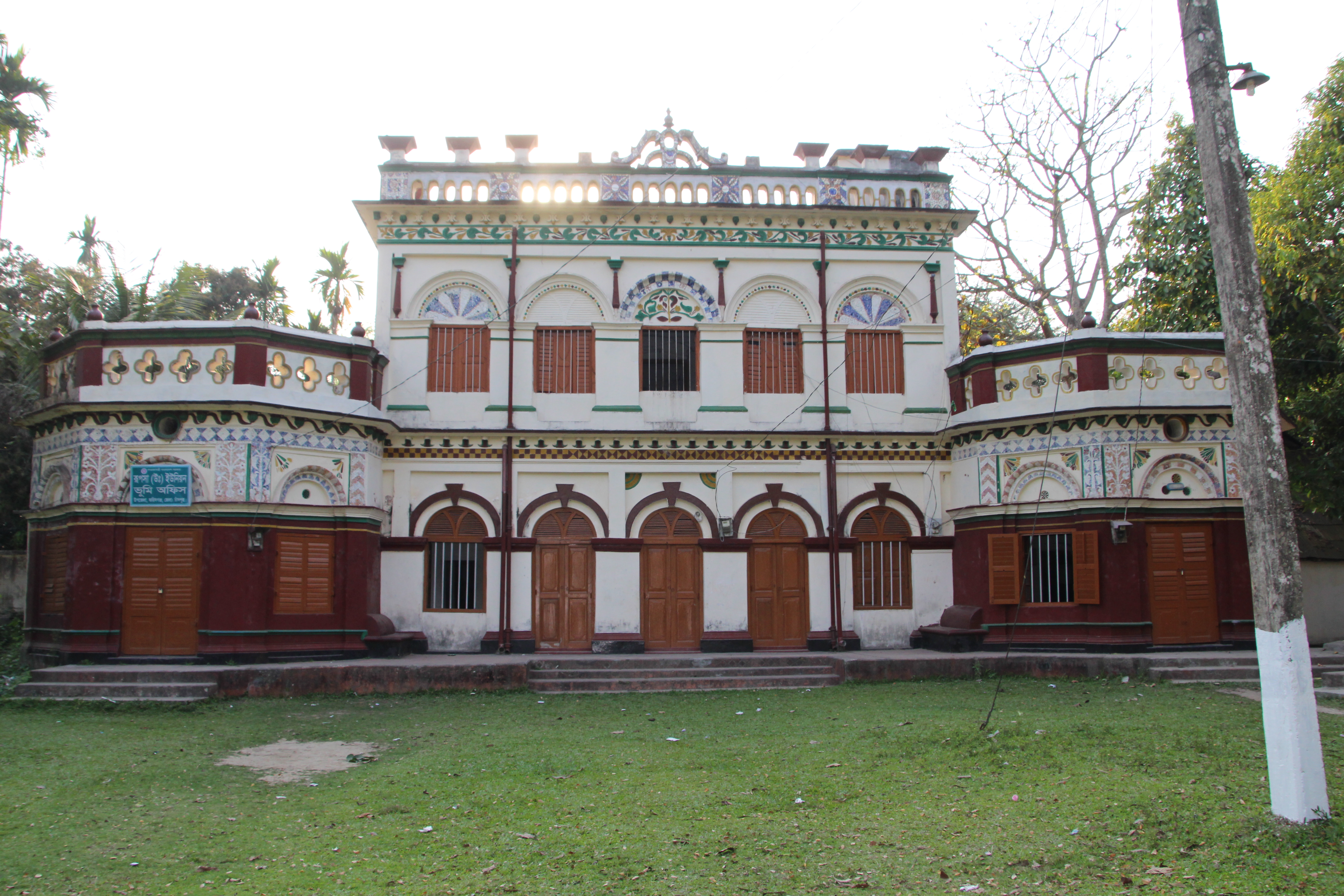
- Rupsha Zamindar Bari

- Coordinates: 23°7.5′N 90°44.9′E
- Country: Bangladesh
- Division: Chittagong
- District: Chandpur
- Headquarters: Faridganj

Area
  - Total: 232.22 km^{2} (89.66 sq mi)

Population (2022)
  - Total: 433,248
  - Density: 1,865.7/km^{2} (4,832.1/sq mi)
- Time zone: UTC+6 (BST)
- Postal code: 3650
- Website: Official Map of Faridganj

Faridganj Upazila mauza geocode map

Faridganj (Bengali: ফরিদগঞ্জ) is an upazila of Chandpur District in Chittagong Division of Bangladesh. It is located between 23°03' and 23°14' north latitudes and in between 90°41' and 90°53' east longitudes.

== Geography ==
Faridganj is located at 23.1250°N 90.7486°E. It has 85,678 households and a total area of 232.22 km^{2}.

== Demographics ==
Religions in Faridganj Upazila (2022)
Religion	Percent
Islam	95.56%
Hinduism	4.42%
Other or not stated	0.02%

According to the 2022 Bangladeshi census, Faridganj Upazila had 107,187 households and a population of 433,248. 10.39% of the population were under 5 years of age. Faridganj had a literacy rate (age 7 and over) of 79.89%: 80.12% for males and 79.71% for females, and a sex ratio of 84.82 males for every 100 females. 69,956 (16.15%) lived in urban areas.

According to the 2011 Census of Bangladesh, Faridganj Upazila had 85,678 households and a population of 396,683. Of these, 95,352 (24.04%) of its inhabitants were under 10 years of age. Faridganj had a literacy rate (age 7 and over) of 58.09%, compared to the national average of 51.8%, and a sex ratio of 1,175 females per 1,000 males. In Faridganj, 35,090 (8.85%) of the population lived in urban areas.

== Administration ==
Faridganj Upazila is divided into Faridganj Municipality and 15 union parishads: Dakshin Faridganj, Dakshin Gobindapur, Dakshin Paik Para, Dakshin Rupsha, Paschim Balithuba, Paschim Char Dukhia, Paschim Gupti, Paschim Subidpur, Purba Balithuba, Purba Char Dukhia, Purba Gupti, Purba Subidpur, Uttar Gobindapur, Uttar Paikpara, and Uttar Rupsha. The union parishads are subdivided into 159 mauzas and 161 villages.

Faridganj Municipality is subdivided into 9 wards and 21 mahallas.

== Education ==
There are four colleges in the upazila. They include Faridganj Bangabandhu Degree College, founded in 1970, Gallak Adarsha College (1994), and Gridakalindia Hazera Hasmath Degree College (1995).

According to Banglapedia, notable secondary schools include Baragaon High School (founded 1899), Basara High School (1926), Chandra Imam Ali High School and College (1918), Grehakalindia High School (1926), Kaonia Shaheed Habibullah High School (1926), Paikpara U.G High School (1913), and Rupsa Ahmadia High School (1913).

== Notable people ==
- Abidur Reza Chowdhury (1872–1961), politician and educationist

== See also ==
- Upazilas of Bangladesh
- Districts of Bangladesh
- Divisions of Bangladesh
- Administrative geography of Bangladesh
