= Chandpur District =

District of Bangladesh in Chittagong Division

Chandpur District চাঁদপুর জেলা
- District of Bangladesh
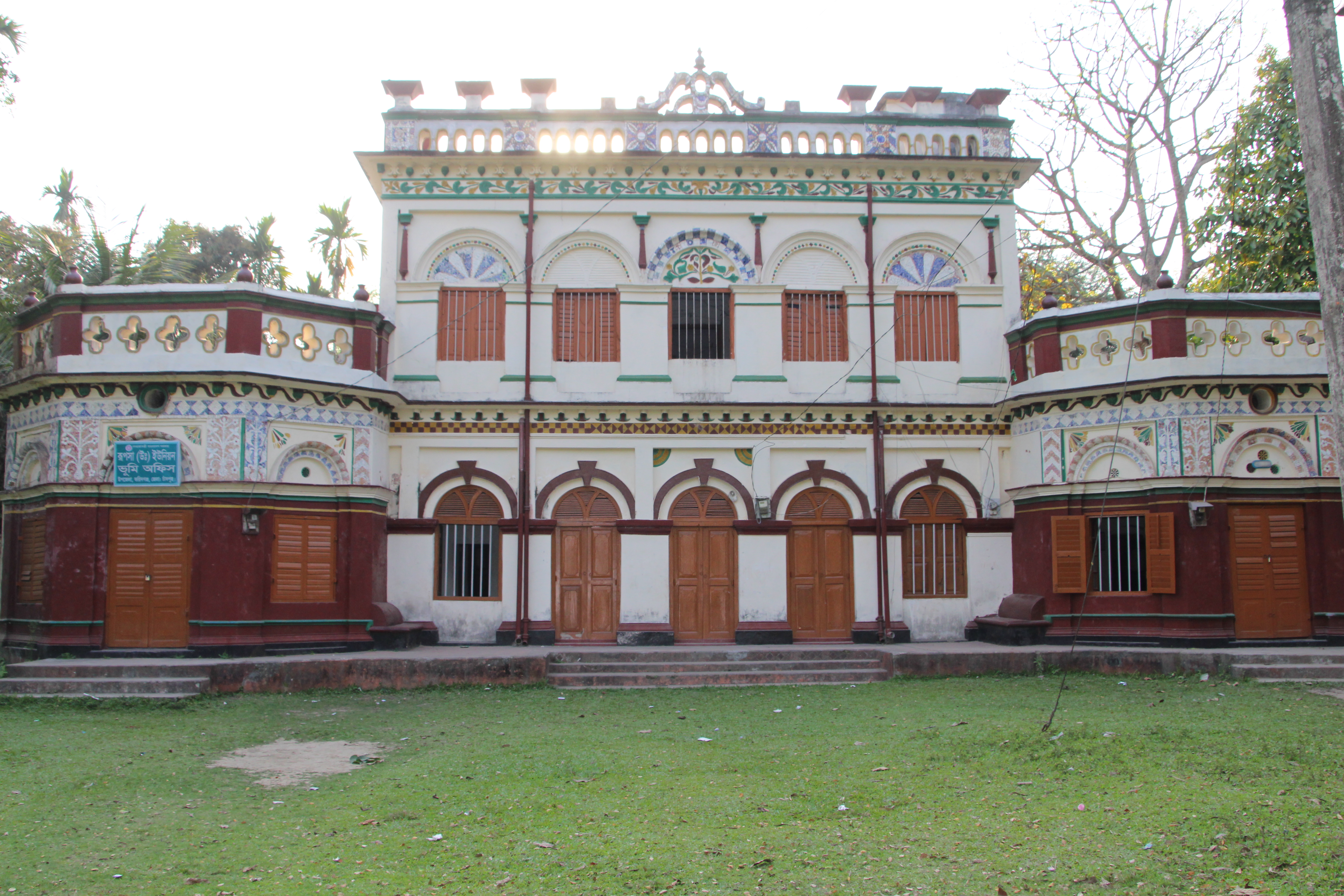
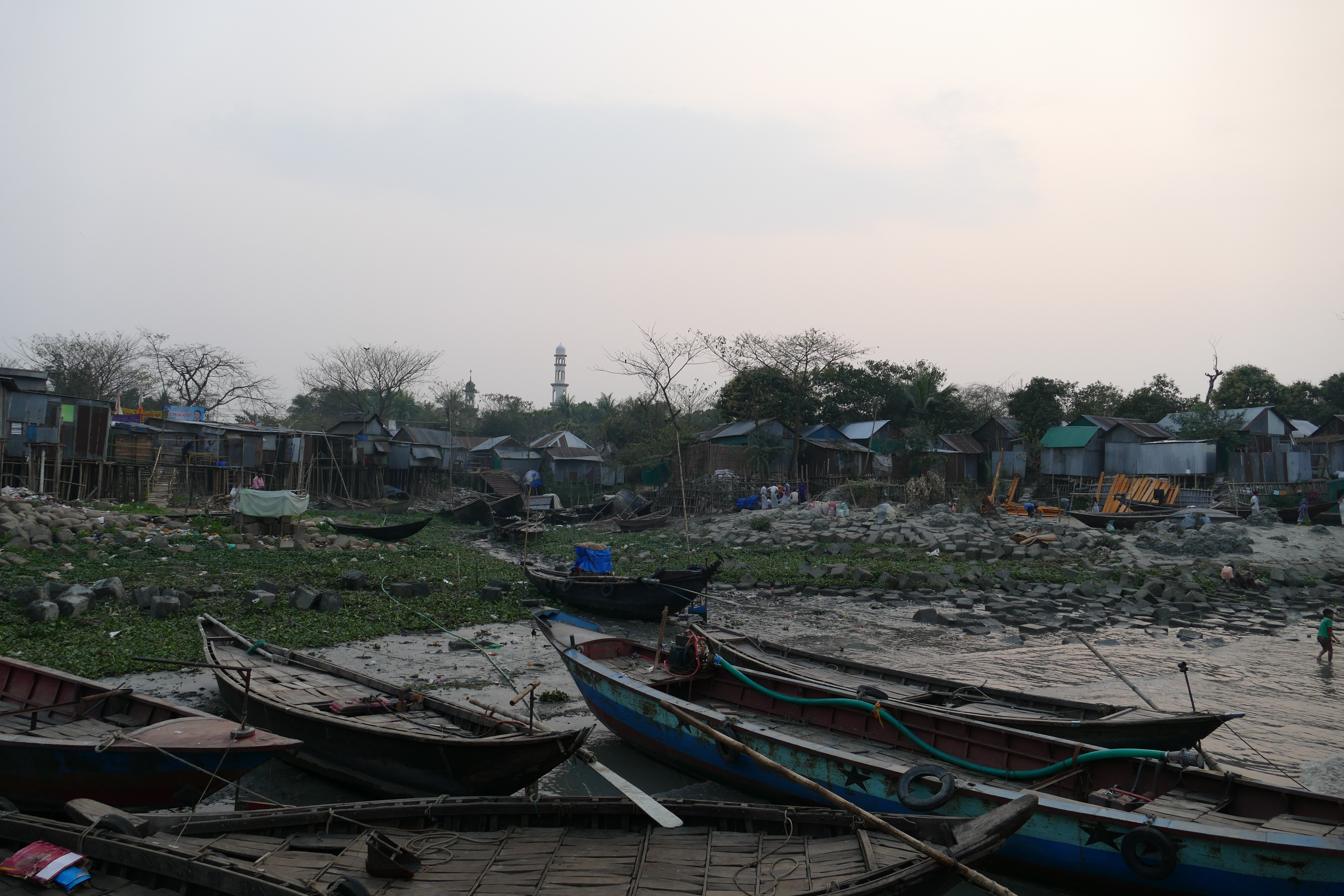
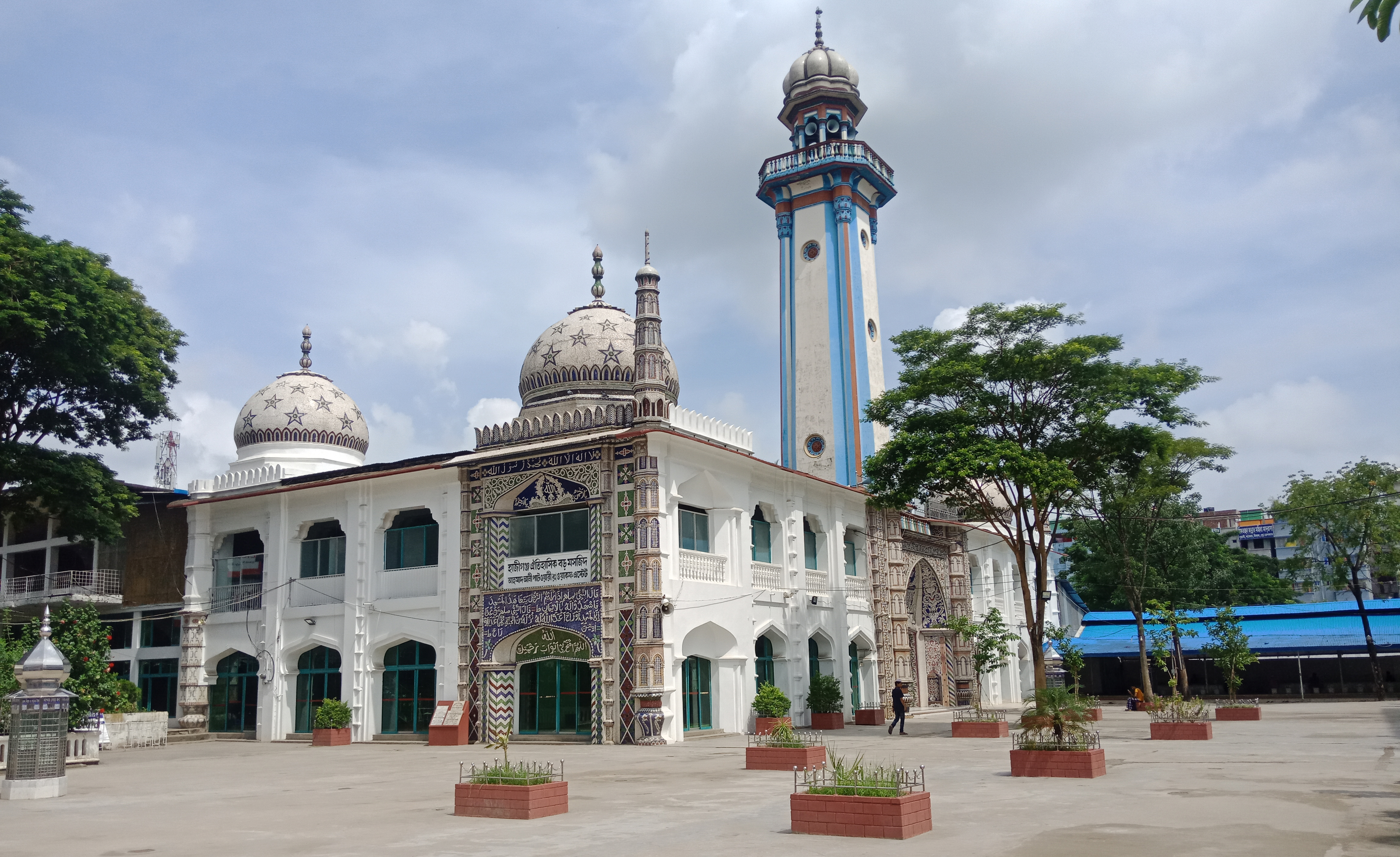
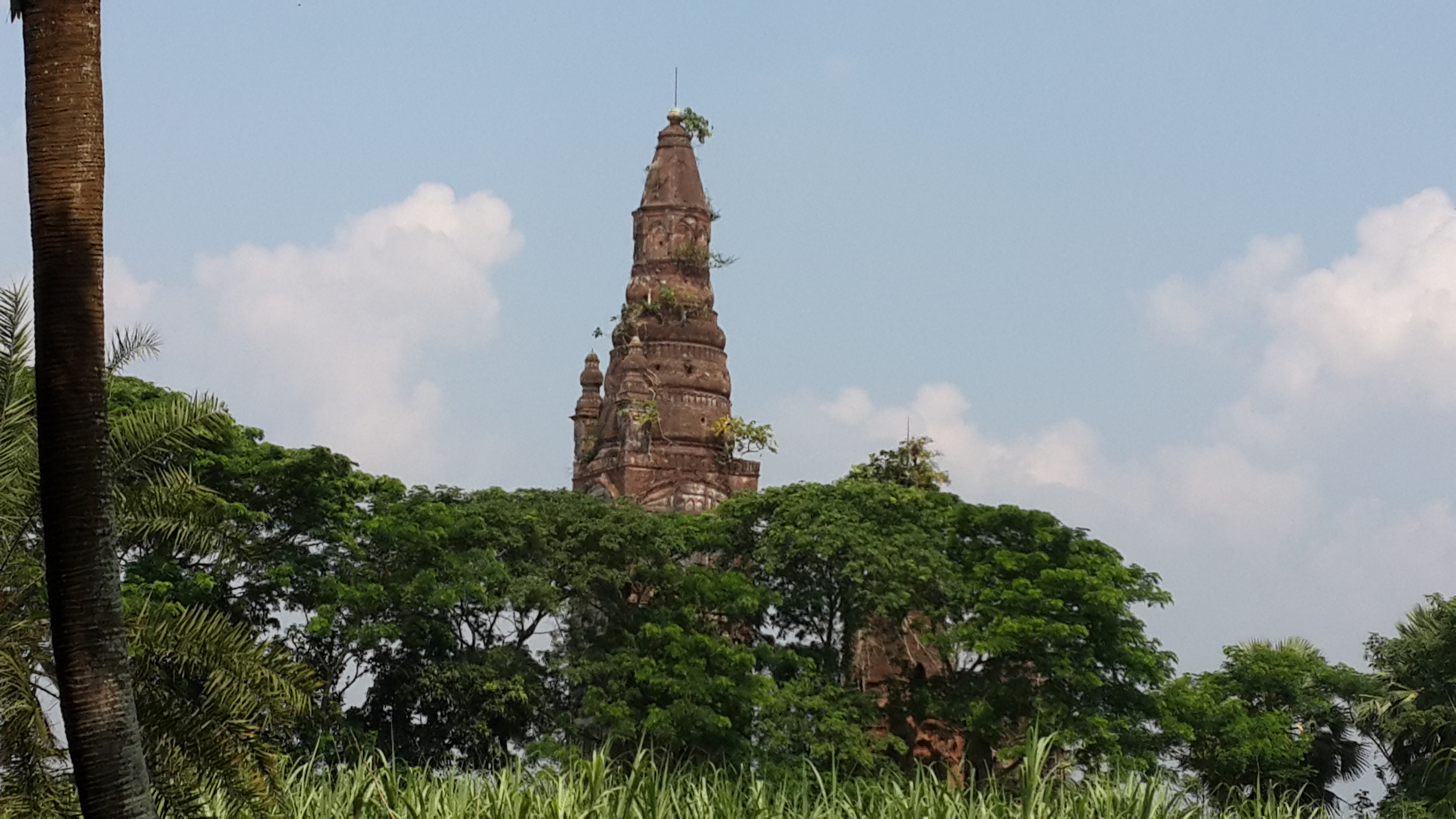
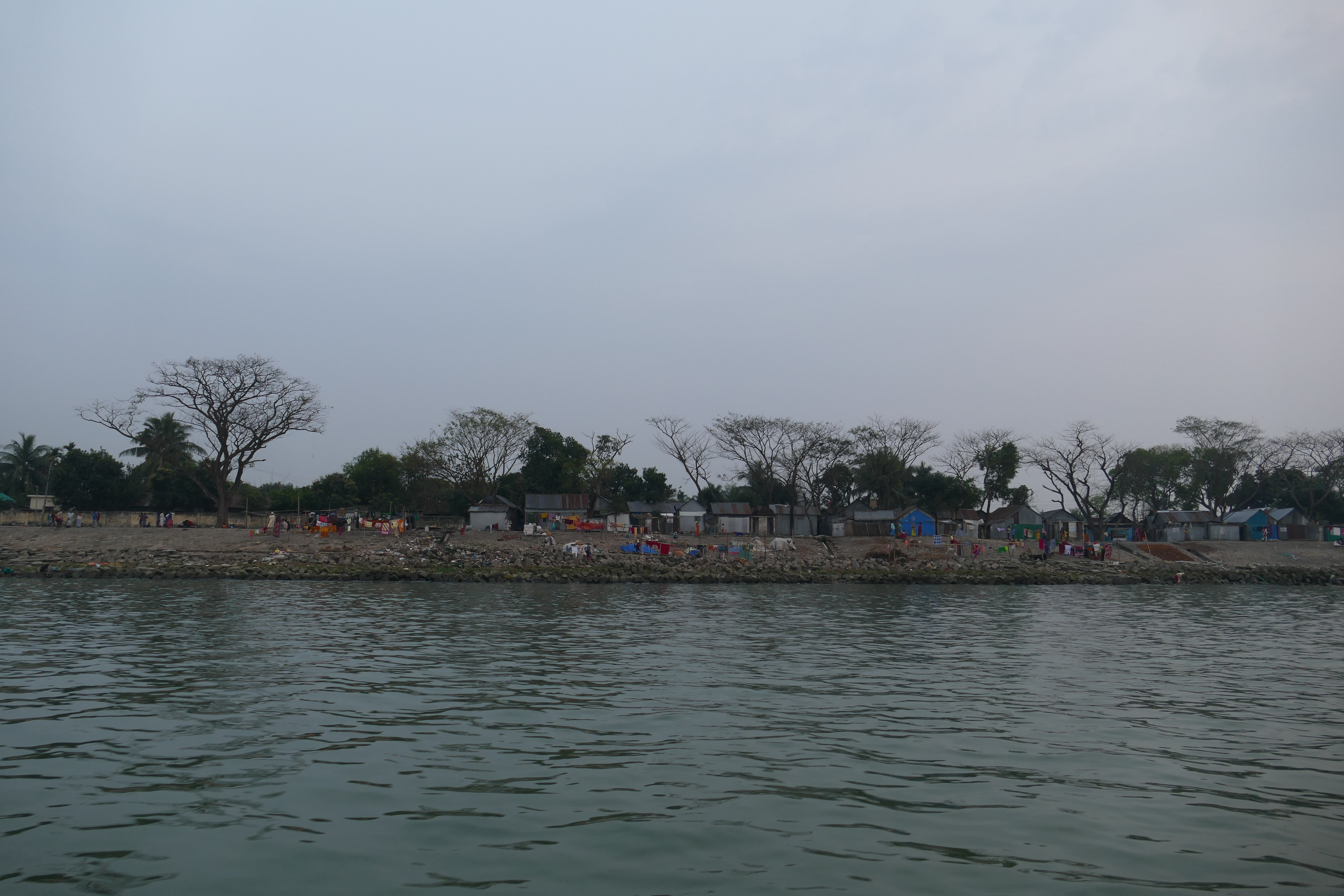
- Clockwise from top-left: Aerial view of Chandpur bridge, Rupsha Zamindar Bari, Chandpur Port, Lohagor Math, Meghna River, Hajiganj Boro Masjid

- Interactive map of Chandpur District
- Coordinates: 23.2139°N 90.6361°E
- Country: Bangladesh
- Division: Chittagong Division
- Formed (Mahkuma): 1878
- Established as District: 15 February 1984 (split from Comilla)
- Headquarters: Chandpur

Government
  - Deputy Commissioner: Md. Nazmul Islam Sarker

Area
  - Total: 1,704.06 km^{2} (657.94 sq mi)

Population (2022)
  - Total: 2,635,748
- (Current estimate approx. 2.75 million in 2026)
- Time zone: UTC+06:00 (BST)
- Postal code: 3600
- Area code: 0841
- ISO 3166 code: BD-09
- HDI (2021): 0.695 (Medium)
- Website: www.chandpur.gov.bd

Chandpur District (Bengali: চাঁদপুর জেলা) is a district in Chittagong Division, Bangladesh. Established on 15 February 1984, it is famously known as the "Home of Hilsa" (Bengali: ইলিশের বাড়ি) due to its vast production and trade of Hilsa fish.

== History ==
During the rule of the Baro-Bhuiyans, this region was occupied by Chand Ray, the Zamindar of Bikrampur and son of Kedar Ray. According to historian J. M. Sengupta, the region was named Chandpur, following the name of Chand Ray. On the other hand, others say that the name of this region comes from Chand Faqir of Purindapur mahalla of Chandpur, Bangladesh. It is said that an administrator named Shah Ahmed Chand came here from Delhi in the fifteenth century and established a river port.

In 1779 AD, Major James Rennel, a British surveyor, drew a map of Bengal during the British rule and included an obscure town called Chandpur. At that time, there were offices and courts at a place called Narsinghpur (which has now sunk) south of Chandpur. The confluence of the Padma and the Meghna was about 60 miles south-west of the present place. This area has now disappeared due to the game of breaking the Meghna river.

The first Chandpur subdivision was formed in 1878 as a result of administrative reorganization during the British rule. On 1 October 1896, Chandpur city was declared as a municipality. It was declared as Chandpur district on 15 February 1984.

== Geography ==
The geological structure of the district dates back to the Pleistocene and Holocene eras. The geographical history of the district can be traced back to the ancient maps of East India compiled by Perguitar.

The district is situated at the confluence of the Padma, Meghna, and Dakatia Rivers. As of 2026, major riverbank protection projects have been completed to safeguard the district from erosion. The "Molhead" (Boro Station) in Chandpur Sadar is a significant geographical and tourist landmark where the three major rivers meet. The district is mainly composed of flat plains created by alluvial deposits of the Meghna.

== Education ==
By 2026, Chandpur has emerged as a key educational hub in the region. Notable institutions include:

- Chandpur Science and Technology University (CSTU): A major technical institution that has significantly expanded its campus and research facilities by 2026.
- Chandpur Medical College: A government medical college providing advanced medical education and healthcare services.
- Chandpur Government College: One of the oldest and most prestigious institutions in the district.
- Chandpur Polytechnic Institute: Is a government polytechnic institute in Chandpur, Bangladesh. The institute is located at the city area Kachua, 50 km (31 mi) from the Chandpur City.
- Hajigonj Model Government College
- Matlab Government Degree College
- Sojatpur Degree College

== Economy and Infrastructure ==
The economy of Chandpur is primarily driven by fisheries, agriculture, and trade.

- Fisheries: Chandpur is the largest hub for Hilsa fish in Bangladesh, and its port serves as a primary distribution point.
- Infrastructure: As of 2026, the proposed Shariatpur–Chandpur Bridge (or Tunnel) project has reached critical development stages. This project is vital for connecting the Chittagong Division with the south-western districts of Bangladesh. The Chandpur River Port has been modernized with a multi-storey terminal to facilitate safer and faster river transport.

== Demographics ==
Historical population
Year	Pop.	±% p.a.
1974	1,543,183	—
1981	1,796,777	+2.20%
1991	2,032,449	+1.24%
2001	2,271,229	+1.12%
2011	2,416,018	+0.62%
2022	2,635,748	+0.79%

According to the 2022 Census of Bangladesh, Chandpur District had 635,431 households and a population of 2,635,748 with an average 4.09 people per household. Among the population, 545,365 (20.69%) inhabitants were under 10 years of age. The population density was 1,602 people per km^{2}. Chandpur District had a literacy rate (age 7 and over) of 78.23%, compared to the national average of 74.80%, and a sex ratio of 1144 females per 1000 males. Approximately 26.23% of the population lived in urban areas. The ethnic population was 2,863.

Religions in Chandpur District (2022)
Religion	Percent
Islam	94.41%
Hinduism	5.56%
Other or not stated	0.03%

Religion in present-day Chandpur District
Religion	1941 (Note: 1941 census figures are for Chandpur subdivision of Tippera district, which roughly corresponds to the present district)		1981		1991		2001		2011		2022	
Religion	Pop.	%	Pop.	%	Pop.	%	Pop.	%	Pop.	%	Pop.	%
Islam	855,937	79.99%	1,646,304	91.63%	1,881,130	92.56%	2,124,397	93.54%	2,269,246	93.93%	2,488,435	94.41%
Hinduism	213,022	19.91%	149,125	8.30%	145,871	7.18%	145,003	6.38%	145,551	6.02%	146,524	5.56%
Others (Note: Including Jainism, Christianity, Buddhism, Zoroastrianism, Judaism, Ad-Dharmis, or not stated)	1,069	0.10%	1,348	0.08%	5,448	0.26%	1,829	0.08%	1,221	0.05%	789	0.03%
Total Population	1,070,028	100%	1,796,777	100%	2,032,449	100%	2,271,229	100%	2,416,018	100%	2,635,748	100%

Muslims make up 94.41% of the population, while Hindus are 5.56% of the population. The Hindu population has remained relatively constant at 145,000 while its percentage has decreased.

== Administrative subdivisions ==
=== Upazilas ===
Chandpur District upazila geocode map

Chandpur District is divided into the following sub-districts (upazilas):

1. Chandpur Sadar Upazila
2. Faridganj Upazila
3. Haimchar Upazila
4. Hajiganj Upazila
5. Kachua Upazila
6. Matlab Dakshin Upazila
7. Matlab Uttar Upazila
8. Shahrasti Upazila

== Notable residents ==
- Mohammad Abdullah, politician and academic
- Wahiduddin Ahmed, academic
- Shamsul Alam, State Minister of Planning and Awami League politician
- Abul Kalam Azad, businessman, traded coconuts from village to village in the district as a child.
- Kabir Bakul, lyricist and journalist
- Amena Begum, a former member of parliament of East Pakistan
- Nasiruddin family
  - Mohammad Nasiruddin, journalist
  - Nurjahan Begum, female journalist
- Abidur Reza Chowdhury (1872–1961), politician and educationist
- Mizanur Rahman Chowdhury, former prime minister
- Humayun Kabir Dhali, author and journalist
- Dildar, actor
- G. M. Fazlul Haque, BNP politician
- Mohammad Anwar Hossain, army officer and Liberation War martyr
- Neamat Imam, author
- Monirul Islam, artist
- Burhanuddin Khan Jahangir, academic and writer
- Mahmudul Hasan Joy, cricketer
- Shantanu Kaiser, poet and essayist
- Janab Ali Majumdar, Member of the Bengal Legislative Assembly
- Kaus Mia, businessman, was born in Chandpur in 1931.
- Abu Naser Muhammad Ehsanul Haque Milan, politician and current Minister of Education
- Wadud family
  - MA Wadud, Bengali language activist and politician
  - Dipu Moni, former social welfare minister during Sheikh Hasina's rule
- Tania Sultana Popy, actress
- Rezaul Karim Reza, footballer
- Nurul Amin Ruhul, also known as Ruhul Bhai, Awami League MP
- Shykh Seraj, journalist, media personality and agriculture development activist
- Farida Zaman, artist and illustrator
- Abul Hossain, footballer
- Nurul Haque Manik, footballer
- Mostafa Hossain Mukul, footballer
- Mujibar Rahman, information minister of East Pakistan

== See also ==
- Achalchhila
- Adsa
