= M. A. Muhit =

Bangladeshi politician (born 1969)

- এম. এ. মুহিত
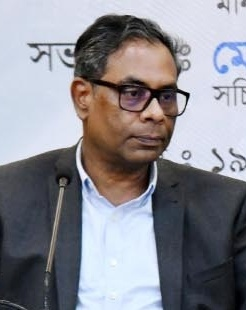
- Muhit in 2026

Minister of State for Health and Family Welfare
- Incumbent
- Assumed office 17 February 2026
- Prime Minister: Tarique Rahman
- Preceded by: Md Sayedur Rahman (as special assistant)

Member of the Bangladesh Parliament for Sirajganj-6
- Incumbent
- Assumed office 17 February 2026
- Preceded by: Choyon Islam

Personal details
- Born: 5 October 1969 (age 57) Dhaka, East Pakistan
- Party: Bangladesh Nationalist Party
- Parent: M. A. Matin (father)
- Relatives: Abdullah al Mahmood (grandfather); Iqbal Hassan Mahmood (uncle)
- Education: Dhaka Medical College (MBBS); University of Bristol (MSc); UCL (MSc); LSHTM (PhD)

Mohammad Abdul Muhit (Bengali: মোহাম্মদ আব্দুল মুহিত; born 5 October 1969), known as M. A. Muhit (এম. এ. মুহিত), is a Bangladeshi physician and politician from the Bangladesh Nationalist Party. He is the incumbent State Minister of Health and Family Welfare and Member of Parliament representing the Sirajganj-6 constituency.

== Early life and education ==
Mohammad Abdul Muhit was born on 5 October 1969 in Dhaka to M. A. Matin, a former deputy prime minister and minister of home affairs of Bangladesh, and Tashmina Mahmood, a physician and daughter of Abdullah al Mahmood, former minister of industries and natural resources of Pakistan.

Muhit completed his SSC & HSC from Dhaka Residential Model College (DRMC), undergraduate medical training (MBBS) at Dhaka Medical College and pursued higher studies in the United Kingdom.

Muhit earned a Master of Science (MSc) in clinical ophthalmology from the University of Bristol and a Master of Science (MSc) in community ophthalmology from University College London, and holds a PhD in public health ophthalmology from the London School of Hygiene & Tropical Medicine.

== Career ==
Muhit is an ophthalmologist and public health specialist who has worked in eye health, disability services, and higher education administration. He is the chairman and former pro-vice-chancellor of the University of South Asia, vice-chairman at North Bengal Medical College in Sirajganj, and president of the BNSB Eye Hospitals, Sirajganj.

Muhit's published research focuses on childhood eye disease and blindness, barriers to accessing eye care, and childhood disability and rehabilitation in Bangladesh.

Muhit is the founder and president of CSF Global (formerly the Child Sight Foundation), a non-profit organisation that links children with disabilities to medical and eye care treatment, conducts research, and provides disability services.

== Political career ==
Muhit is a politician of the Bangladesh Nationalist Party in Shahjadpur Upazila, Sirajganj District. He first contested the Sirajganj-6 seat in the 2018 general election as a BNP candidate.

In the 2026 Bangladeshi general election, he won the Sirajganj-6 seat and joined the cabinet of Tarique Rahman as the state minister of health and family welfare.

== Family ==
Muhit's father, Mohammed Abdul Matin, was an ophthalmologist and politician who served as a deputy prime minister of Bangladesh and held multiple cabinet posts, including health and home affairs. He is the founder of the University of South Asia and the founder-chairman of North Bengal Medical College in Sirajganj.

Muhit's mother, Tashmina Mahmood (also known as Tashmina Matin), was an obstetrician and gynaecologist who served as the founding principal of North Bengal Medical College, Sirajganj, and later chaired the Board of Management of the University of South Asia in Dhaka. His elder brother, M. A. Muqueet, is a cardiologist and the chairman of the Department of Cardiology at Bangladesh Medical University.

His maternal grandfather, Abdullah al Mahmood, was a lawyer and politician who served as the minister for industries and natural resources of Pakistan. His maternal uncle, Iqbal Hassan Mahmood, is a Bangladesh Nationalist Party national standing committee member, a member of parliament for Sirajganj-2, and the minister of power, energy, and mineral resources in the cabinet of Tarique Rahman.
