= Sirajganj-1 =

Constituency of Bangladesh's Jatiya Sangsad

Coordinates: 24.65°N 89.64°E

- Constituency for the Jatiya Sangsad
- District: Sirajganj District
- Division: Rajshahi Division
- Electorate: 345,603 (2018)

Current constituency
- Created: 1984
- Party: Bangladesh Nationalist Party
- Member: Md. Salim Reza
- ← 61 Natore-4 63 Sirajganj-2 →

Sirajganj-1 is a constituency represented in the Jatiya Sangsad (National Parliament) of Bangladesh since 2026 by Md. Salim Reza of the Bangladesh Nationalist Party.

== Boundaries ==
The constituency encompasses Kazipur Upazila and five union parishads of Sirajganj Sadar Upazila: Bagbati, Bahuli, Mechhra, Ratankandi, and Chhongachha.

== History ==
The constituency was created in 1984 from a Pabna constituency when the former Pabna District was split into two districts: Sirajganj and Pabna.

Ahead of the 2008 general election, the Election Commission redrew constituency boundaries to reflect population changes revealed by the 2001 Bangladesh census. The 2008 redistricting altered the boundaries of the constituency.

Ahead of the 2018 general election, the Election Commission expanded the boundaries of the constituency by adding one union parishad of Sirajganj Sadar Upazila: Bahuli.

Ahead of the 2026 general election, the Election Commission decided to return the boundaries to how it was for the 2008 general election.

== Members of Parliament ==
Election	Member	Party
1986	Mohammed Nasim	Awami League
1988	Shafiqul Islam	Independent
1991	Mohammed Nasim	Awami League
Sep 1996 by-election	Mohammad Selim	Awami League
2001	Mohammed Nasim	Awami League
2008	Tanvir Shakil Joy	Awami League
2014	Mohammed Nasim	Awami League
2020 by-election	Tanvir Shakil Joy	Awami League
2026	Md. Salim Reza	Bangladesh Nationalist Party

== Elections ==
=== Elections in the 2010s ===
Mohammed Nasim was elected unopposed in the 2014 general election after opposition parties withdrew their candidacies in a boycott of the election.

=== Elections in the 2000s ===
General Election 2008: Sirajganj-1
Party	Candidate	Votes	%	±%
AL	Tanvir S. Joy	177,732	80.7	+9.0
BNP	Abdul Mazid	40,814	18.5	−8.4
CPB	Md. Abdul Baque	1,806	0.8	N/A
Majority		136,918	62.1	+17.2
Turnout		220,352	85.6	+20.3
AL hold				

General Election 2001: Sirajganj-1
Party	Candidate	Votes	%	±%
AL	Mohammed Nasim	101,981	71.7	−20.5
BNP	Abdul Mazid	38,202	26.9	+20.3
Independent	Muhammad Salim	1,250	0.9	N/A
IJOF	Md. A. Barek Bakul	471	0.3	N/A
Independent	Feroz Ahmed Chowdhury	296	0.2	N/A
Majority		63,779	44.9	−40.7
Turnout		142,200	65.3	+21.3
AL hold				

=== Elections in the 1990s ===
Mohammed Nasim stood for two seats in the June 1996 general election: Sirajganj-1 and Sirajganj-2. After winning both, he chose to represent Sirajganj-2 and quit Sirajganj-1, triggering a by-election in Sirajganj-1. Mohammad Salim of the Awami League was elected in a September by-election.

Sirajganj-1 by-election, 1996
Party	Candidate	Votes	%	±%
AL	Mohammad Salim	55,488	92.2	+24.2
BNP	Mahbubul Islam Talukder	3,963	6.6	−19.5
JP(E)	Lutfar Rahman	728	1.2	−2.3
Majority		51,525	85.6	+43.7
Turnout		60,179	44.0	−23.0
AL hold				

General Election June 1996: Sirajganj-1
Party	Candidate	Votes	%	±%
AL	Mohammed Nasim	62,383	68.0	+6.7
BNP	Abdul Mazid	23,927	26.1	−7.7
JP(E)	Tati Tozzammel Haque	3,175	3.5	N/A
Jamaat	T. M. Ahsan Habib	1,869	2.0	−2.4
Zaker Party	Md. Abdur Razzak	364	0.4	−0.2
Jatiya Janata Party (Asad)	S. M. Faridul Haque	89	0.1	N/A
Majority		38,456	41.9	+14.4
Turnout		91,807	67.0	+25.8
AL hold				

General Election 1991: Sirajganj-1
Party	Candidate	Votes	%	±%
AL	Mohammed Nasim	48,338	61.3	
BNP	Aamir Hossain Vulu	26,618	33.8	
Jamaat	Kamruzzaman	3,444	4.4	
Zaker Party	Golam Ambia Tang	453	0.6	
Majority		21,720	27.5	
Turnout		78,853	41.2	
AL gain from				
