= Md. Jalal Uddin =

Bangladeshi politician

- মোঃ জালাল উদ্দিন

Member of the Bangladesh Parliament for Chandpur-2
- Incumbent
- Assumed office 17 February 2026
- Preceded by: Mofazzal Hossain Chowdhury

Personal details
- Born: 4 January 1959 (age 67) Matlab Uttar Upazila, Chandpur District
- Party: Bangladesh Nationalist Party

Md. Jalal Uddin is a Bangladeshi politician of the Bangladesh Nationalist Party. He is currently serving as a member of parliament from Chandpur-2 .

== Early life ==
Uddin was born on 4 January 1959 at Matlab Uttar Upazila under Chandpur District.
