= Jannat Ara Henry =

Bangladeshi politician

- জান্নাত আরা হেনরী

Member of the Bangladesh Parliament for Sirajganj-2
- In office 29 January 2024 – 6 August 2024
- Preceded by: Md. Habibe Millat
- Succeeded by: Iqbal Hassan Mahmood

Personal details
- Born: 22 June 1972 (age 54) Kamarkhanda, Sirajganj, Bangladesh
- Party: Bangladesh Awami League
- Spouse: ""
- Occupation: Politician

Jannat Ara Henry Talukder (born 22 June 1972) is a Bangladeshi politician. She is a former Jatiya Sangsad member representing the Sirajganj-2 constituency. She is serving as the joint general secretary of Bangladesh Awami League at the Sirajganj District.

== Career ==
Jannat Ara Henry served as the joint general secretary and the secretary of environment and forrest affairs of Bangladesh Awami League's women division. In 2008 Bangladeshi general election, she got nomination from Awami League for representing the Sirajganj-2 constituency while serving as a high school teacher. She lost the election to Rumana Mahmood from Bangladesh Nationalist Party.

Under Awami League government’s patronage, she later joined the board of directors of Sonali Bank and founded a contract-based construction firm. It helped to boost her personal wealth by nearly 9,300% in 16 years, as documented at her wealth information disclosure to the Election Commission in late 2023. She won the 2024 Bangladeshi general election from the same Sirajganj-2 constituency and became a Jatiya Sangsad member on 29 January 2024.

At the aftermath of the 2024 non-cooperation movement, Henry lost her membership at the parliament on 6 August 2024, serving just less than 7 months. On 30 September, she, along with her husband and chairman of Sirajganj District Council, Shamim Talukder were arrested in Moulvibazar in a case filed over attacks on 2024 Bangladesh quota reform movement protests in Sirajganj Sadar Upazila.

== Personal life ==
Henry is married to Shamim Talukder, chairman of Sirajganj District Council.
