= Md. Salim Reza =

Bangladeshi politician

- মোঃ সেলিম রেজা

Member of the Bangladesh Parliament for Sirajganj-1
- Incumbent
- Assumed office 17 February 2026
- Preceded by: Tanvir Shakil Joy

Personal details
- Born: January 11, 1964 (age 62)q Kazipur Upazila, Sirajganj District
- Party: Bangladesh Nationalist Party

Md. Salim Reza is a Bangladeshi politician of the Bangladesh Nationalist Party. He is currently serving as a member of parliament from Sirajganj-1.

== Early life ==
Reza was born on 11 January 1964 in Kazipur Upazila in Sirajganj District.
