= Dhakirgaon =

Dhakirgaon ঢাকিরগাঁও
- Village
- Location in Bangladesh
- Coordinates: 23°21′N 90°42.5′E
- Country: Bangladesh
- Division: Chittagong Division
- District: Chandpur District
- Upazila: Matlab Dakshin Upazila

Area
  - Total: 0.92 km^{2} (0.36 sq mi)

Population
  - Total: 2,367
  - Density: 2,600/km^{2} (6,700/sq mi)
- Time zone: UTC+6 (Bangladesh Standard Time)
- Postal code: 3640

Dhakirgaon (ঢাকিরগাঁও) is a village of Matlab Dakshin Upazila in Chandpur District in the Division of Chittagong, Bangladesh.

== Geography ==
Dhakirgaon is located at 23.3317°N 90.6998°E. It has a total land area of 0.92 km^{2}.

== Education ==
Dhakirgaon Government Primary School is a notable primary school.

== See also ==
- Villages of Bangladesh
- Upazilas of Bangladesh
- Districts of Bangladesh
- Divisions of Bangladesh
