= Mohanpur Union =

Union Parishad in Matlab Uttar Upazila

Coordinates: 23.4010°N 90.6156°E

Mohanpur Union (Bengali: মোহনপুর, romanized: Mohonpur, lit. 'Mohanpur') is a union parishad in Matlab Uttar Upazila of Chandpur District in the Division of Chittagong, Bangladesh.

== Chairman ==
Present Chairman of the Mohanpur Union Parishad is Kazi Mijanur Rahman, who is the chairman of Mohanpur Parjatan Ltd. There are nine wards in the parishad. Namely:

- Ward No: Villages
- Ward-01: Mahanpur, Komarkhola
- Ward-02: Mohammadpur
- Ward-03: Mudafar, Fatuakandi
- Ward-04: Baherchar
- Ward-05:: Charwebstar
- Ward-06: Bahadurpur
- Ward-07: Athaidi Mathabanga, Mathabanga Balurchar
- Ward-08: Kamaldi Mathabanga
- Ward-09: Pachani, Dewankandi
- Total 13 Villages in 9 wards

== Notable Person ==
Many notable persons were born in Mohanpur Union of Matlab Uttar Upazila in Chandpur District. Some are:-

- Mofazzal Hossain Chowdhury Maya, Ex-Cabinet Minister
- Wahiduddin Ahmed, 3rd Vice Chancellor of BUET, ‍an advisor to the Caretaker government of Bangladesh in December, 1990.
