= Sultanabad Union =

Sultanabad Union সুলতানাবাদ ইউনিয়ন
- Union Council
- No. 14 Sultanabad Union Council
- Location in Bangladesh
- Country: Bangladesh
- Division: Chittagong Division
- District: Chandpur District
- Upazila: North Matlab Upazila

Government
  - Chairman: Abu Bakr Siddiq Khokan

Population
  - Total: 25,788
- Time zone: UTC+6 (BST)
- Website: sultanabadup.chandpur.gov.bd

Sultanabad Union (Bengali: সুলতানাবাদ ইউনিয়ন) is a Union Parishad under North Matlab Upazila of Chandpur District in the Chittagong Division of Bangladesh. It has an area of 14.7 square kilometres and a population of 25,788.

== Geography ==
Sultanabad Union is located in the North Matlab Upazila. It borders East Fatehpur Union in the west, Islamabad Union in the north and South Matlab Upazila in the south and east. It has an area of 14.7 square kilometres.

== Demography ==
Sultanabad has a population of 25,788.

== Administration ==
Sultanabad constitutes the no. 14 union council of North Matlab Upazila. It contains 22 villages and five mouzas: Faridkandi, Gorairkandi, Konyarkandi, Jamalkandi, Majlispur, Islamabad, Nayakandi, Hatighata, North Tarki, Middle Tarki, South Tarki, Vinandapur, Little Lakshmipur, Great Lakshmipur, Char Lakshmipur, Amuakanda, Tatua, Char Barua, Char Pathalia.

=== List of chairmen ===
Name	Term	Notes
Siraj Master	10/2/1963 - 9/2/1969	
Ali Husayn	1963-1968	
Shafiq Mia	1969-1974	
Zahirul Haq	1974-1979	
Siddiqur Rahman Dewanji	1979-1984	
Shafiqul Islam Patwari	2000-2008	
Abdur Rahman Mia	2008-2010	Acting
Manzur Murshid Swapan	2022	
Abu Bakr Siddiq Khokan	2024	Present

== Economy and tourism ==
Sultanabad has hundreds of expatriates in Saudi Arabia, UAE, Bahrain, Oman, Qatar, Kuwait, Maldives, Malaysia, Singapore, Japan, Italy, United States and Australia contributing to its economy. It has many Haat bazaars: Tarki Old Bazaar, Induria Daser Bazaar, Char Pathalia Daskandi Bazar as well as the ones in Amirabad, Janta, Satubazar, Sardarkandi, Badamtali, Little Hadiya, Kaptan Bazar, Gauranga Bazaar and Ananda Bazaar.

== Education ==
The Union has a literacy rate of 80%. It has 9 primary schools and 2 high schools. There are five madrasas.

== Language and culture ==
The native population converse in their native Comillan dialect but can also converse in Standard Bengali. Languages such as Arabic and English are also taught in schools. The Union contains many mosques and eidgahs.

== Notable people ==
- General Aziz Ahmed, former Chief of Army Staff (CAS) of the Bangladesh Army
