= Mohammed Abdul Matin =

Bangladeshi politician

- মুহাম্মদ আব্দুল মতিন

Deputy Prime Minister of Bangladesh
- In office 9 July 1986 – 13 August 1989
- Prime Minister: Mizanur Rahman Chowdhury; Moudud Ahmed
- Preceded by: Jamal Uddin Ahmad
- Succeeded by: Kazi Zafar Ahmed

Minister of Home Affairs
- In office 1 December 1986 – 21 March 1989
- Prime Minister: Mizanur Rahman Chowdhury; Moudud Ahmed
- Preceded by: Mahmudul Hasan
- Succeeded by: Mahmudul Hasan
- In office 27 November 1981 – 24 March 1982
- Prime Minister: Shah Azizur Rahman
- Preceded by: Abu Saleh Mohammad Mustafizur Rahman
- Succeeded by: Hussain Muhammad Ershad

Minister of Health and Family Welfare
- In office 20 March 1989 – 13 August 1989
- Prime Minister: Moudud Ahmed
- Preceded by: Mohammad Abdul Munim
- Succeeded by: Azizur Rahman
- In office 27 March 1988 – 6 August 1988
- Prime Minister: Moudud Ahmed
- Preceded by: Salahuddin Quader Chowdhury
- Succeeded by: Mohammad Abdul Munim
- In office 29 May 1986 – 9 July 1986
- Preceded by: Shamsul Haque
- Succeeded by: Salahuddin Quader Chowdhury
- In office 13 April 1978 – 6 April 1981
- Prime Minister: Shah Azizur Rahman
- Preceded by: A. Q. M. Badruddoza Chowdhury
- Succeeded by: Shamsul Haque

Minister of Road Transport and Bridges
- In office 9 August 1986 – 30 November 1986
- Prime Minister: Mizanur Rahman Chowdhury
- Preceded by: Moudud Ahmed
- Succeeded by: M. Matiur Rahman

Minister of Education
- In office 25 May 1986 – 9 July 1986
- Preceded by: A. K. M. Nurul Islam
- Succeeded by: Momen Uddin Ahmed
- In office 16 February 1986 – 23 March 1986
- Preceded by: Shamsul Huda Chaudhury
- Succeeded by: A. K. M. Nurul Islam

Minister of Housing and Public Works
- In office 4 July 1985 – 24 March 1986
- Preceded by: Mahmudul Hasan
- Succeeded by: Mohammad Abdul Munim

Minister of Commerce
- In office 1 March 1984 – 15 January 1985
- Prime Minister: Ataur Rahman Khan
- Preceded by: Mirza Nurul Huda
- Succeeded by: Sultan Mahmud

Minister of Civil Aviation and Tourism
- In office 15 July 1979 – 22 August 1979
- Prime Minister: Shah Azizur Rahman
- Preceded by: Kazi Anwarul Haque
- Succeeded by: Kazi Anwarul Haque

Member of the Bangladesh Parliament for Sirajganj-7
- In office 28 October 2001 – 27 October 2006
- Preceded by: Choyon Islam
- Succeeded by: Position Abolished
- In office 7 May 1986 – 6 December 1990
- Preceded by: Position Established
- Succeeded by: Kamruddin Ahia Khan Majlish

Member of the Bangladesh Parliament for Pabna-5
- In office 18 February 1979 – 24 March 1982
- Preceded by: Abdul Momin Talukdar
- Succeeded by: Rafiqul Islam Bakul

Member of the 4th National Assembly of Pakistan
- In office 12 June 1965 – 25 March 1969
- Preceded by: Abdullah al Mahmood
- Succeeded by: Constituency abolished
- Constituency: Pabna-3

Personal details
- Born: 13 November 1937 Shahzadpur, Pabna District, Bengal
- Died: 13 June 2012 (aged 74) Shantinagar, Dhaka, Bangladesh
- Party: Bangladesh Jatiya Party
- Other political affiliations: Jatiya Party (Ershad); Bangladesh Nationalist Party; Bangladesh Muslim League
- Spouse: Tasmina Mahmood
- Children: M. A. Muhit
- Relatives: Abdullah al Mahmood (father-in-law); Iqbal Hassan Mahmood (brother-in-law)

Mohammed Abdul Matin (Bengali: মোহাম্মদ আব্দুল মতিন; 13 November 1937 – 13 June 2012), popularly known as MA Matin, was a Bangladesh Jatiya Party politician and a deputy prime minister of Bangladesh.

== Early life and education ==
Mohammed Abdul Matin was born on 13 November 1937 to a Bengali Muslim family in Shahzadpur, Sirajganj, then a part of the Pabna District of the Bengal Presidency. He completed his matriculation in 1953 and also secured 5th position in the national wide order of merit. In 1955 he passed his higher secondary course from Dhaka College. He obtained his MBBS degree from Dhaka Medical College in 1960.

== Career ==
Matin founded Sirajganj Shishu Hospital and North Bengal Medical College in Sirajganj. He was the former chairman of the Bangladesh Jatiya Party.

Matin was elected to parliament from Pabna-5 as a Bangladesh Muslim League candidate in 1979. He was elected as a member of parliament from the then Sirajganj-7 constituency as a candidate of Jatiya Party in the 3rd Jatiya Sangsad elections on 7 May 1986 and the 4th Jatiya Sangsad on 3 March 1988. Matin was elected to parliament from Sirajganj-7 as a Bangladesh Jatiya Party candidate in 2001.

== Personal life ==
His wife Tasmina Mahmud, a notable physician, was the daughter of Abdullah al Mahmood, former minister of industries and natural resources of Pakistan, and the sister of BNP politician Iqbal Hassan Mahmood.

His elder son, Mohammed Abdul Muqit, is a professor in the Department of Cardiology at the Bangabandhu Sheikh Mujib Medical University. His younger son, Mohammed Abdul Muhit, is a deputy vice-chancellor for the Asian University of Bangladesh.

== Death ==
Matin died at his home in Shantinagar from cardiac arrest on 13 June 2012. He was buried in his family graveyard in Sirajganj.
