= Shamsul Haque (Chandpur politician) =

Bangladeshi politician (1931–2015)

- এম শামসুল হক

Minister of Commerce
- In office 3 May 1990 – 30 November 1990
- Prime Minister: Kazi Zafar Ahmed
- Preceded by: M. A. Sattar
- Succeeded by: Imam Uddin Ahmed Chowdhury (as Advisor)

Minister of Planning
- In office 25 May 1986 – 07 July 1986
- Prime Minister: Ataur Rahman Khan
- Preceded by: A. Majeed Khan
- Succeeded by: A. K. Khandker

Minister of Information and Broadcasting
- In office 8 March 1984 – 19 January 1985
- Prime Minister: Ataur Rahman Khan
- Preceded by: Syed Najmuddin Hashim
- Succeeded by: AR Yusuf

Minister of Health and Family Welfare
- In office 11 December 1983 – 23 March 1986
- Prime Minister: Ataur Rahman Khan
- Preceded by: Himself (as Advisor)
- Succeeded by: Mohammed Abdul Matin (Acting)
- In office 27 March 1982 – 11 December 1983
- Preceded by: A. Q. M. Badruddoza Chowdhury
- Succeeded by: Himself (as Minister)

Member of Bangladesh Parliament
- In office 3 March 1988 – 6 December 1990
- Preceded by: Himself
- Succeeded by: Md. Nurul Huda
- In office 7 May 1986 – 3 March 1988
- Preceded by: Position Established
- Succeeded by: Himself

Personal details
- Born: 1 September 1931 Matlab Uttar Upazila, Chandpur District, Bengal Presidency, British India
- Died: 21 November 2015 (aged 84) Dhaka, Bangladesh
- Party: Jatiya Party (Ershad)

Military service
- Allegiance: Bangladesh; Pakistan (before 1971)
- Branch: Bangladesh Army; Pakistan Army
- Years of service: 1956–1982
- Rank: Major General
- Unit: Army Medical Corps
- Commands: Director General of Directorate General of Medical Services

Major General Shamsul Haque (1 September 1931 – 21 November 2015) was a major general of the Bangladesh Army. He was also a Jatiya Party (Ershad) politician and a former member of parliament for Chandpur-2.

== Early life ==
Haque was born on 1 September 1931, in Matlab Uttar Upazila, Chandpur District, Bengal Presidency, British India (now Bangladesh).

== Career ==
Haque joined the Pakistan Army in 1956. In 1971, he was Pakistan Air Force on deputation. Squadron Leader was posted in PAF Base, Dhaka. After the crackdown he escaped from there and joined the liberation war of Bangladesh. In September 1971, when the Army Medical Corps was founded, he was appointed as the first director general of the Directorate General of Medical Services. He served as the director general of the Directorate General of Medical Services from September 1971 to 5 April 1982. He was elected to parliament from Chandpur-2 as a Jatiya Party candidate in 1986 and 1988.
