= Mohammad Selim =

Bangladeshi politician

Member of Parliament for Sirajganj-1
- In office 1996–2001
- Preceded by: Mohammed Nasim
- Succeeded by: Mohammed Nasim

Personal details
- Born: 1940 Sirajganj, British India
- Died: 20 January 2015 (aged 75) London, United Kingdom
- Party: Bangladesh Awami League
- Parent: M Mansur Ali (father)
- Relatives: Mohammed Nasim

Mohammad Selim (1940 – 20 January 2015) was a Bangladesh Awami League politician and a former Jatiya Sangsad member for the Sirajganj-1 constituency.

== Early life and family ==
Selim was born in 1940 to a Bengali Muslim family of Sarkars hailing from Kuripara in Qazipur, Sirajganj (then under Pabna District), Bengal Presidency. Selim's father was Captain M Mansur Ali, a key figure of Bangladeshi independence and a former prime minister of Bangladesh. His brother is the former health minister Mohammed Nasim.

== Career ==
Selim was elected to Parliament in 1996 from Sirajganj-1 as a Bangladesh Awami League candidate. He was an advisory and presidium member of Bangladesh Awami League.
