= Wahiduddin Ahmed =

Bangladeshi academic (1923–2018)

3rd Vice-Chancellor of Bangladesh University of Engineering and Technology
- In office 25 April 1975 – 24 April 1983
- Preceded by: Mohammed Abu Naser
- Succeeded by: Abdul Matin Patwari

Personal details
- Born: 16 August 1921 Matlab Uttar, Chandpur, Bengal Presidency, British India
- Died: 3 November 2018 (aged 95) Dhaka, Bangladesh
- Resting place: Matlab, Chandpur
- Education: Ph.D. (civil engineering)
- Alma mater: Jagannath College; University of Dhaka; Aligarh Muslim University; University of California Berkeley; University of Wales
- Occupation: university academic, professor

Wahiduddin Ahmed (1 January 1923 – 3 November 2018) was a Bangladeshi academic. He served as the 3rd vice-chancellor of Bangladesh University of Engineering and Technology. He had been a Fellow of Bangladesh Academy of Sciences since 1975. He was born on January 1, 1923, in Pachani Village of Mohanpur Union of Matlab Uttar Upazila in Chandpur.

== Education ==
Ahmed passed matriculation examination from Nunshiganj High School in Comilla in 1939 and intermediate examination from Jagannath Intermediate College in Dhaka in 1941. He earned his two bachelor's degrees from the University of Dhaka in 1943 and from M. V. Aligarh University in 1947. He obtained his master's from the University of California Berkeley in 1950 and Ph.D. from University of Wales in 1962.

== Career ==
Ahmed joined as an assistant professor in Ahsanullah Engineering College (later became Bangladesh University of Engineering and Technology (BUET)) in 1951. He joined as the first principal of Chittagong Engineering College in 1967 and the director of Technical Education in 1972.

Ahmed served as the vice-chancellor of BUET from April 1975 to April 1983. From 1986 to 1992, he was the vice chairman of Council of BITs. In December 1990, he was appointed an adviser to the interim government led by the then president Justice Shahabuddin Ahmed.
