= A. B. Siddique =

Bangladeshi politician

AB Siddique
- In office 1979-2012

Personal details
- Born: 1927 Matlab Dakshin Upazila, Chandpur District, Bangladesh
- Died: 3 September 2012 (aged 84–85) Dhaka, Bangladesh
- Party: Awami League
- Children: 2 son, 1 girl
- Parent: Hasan Ali Sarkar (father)

AB Siddique (1927 - 3 September 2012) was a Bangladeshi politician. He was the organizer of the War of Liberation, and member of the People's Council of 3 and parliament of the Awami League Comilla-21 (now-Chandpur-2 & Chandpur-3) seat in Bangladesh.

== Early life and education ==
Siddique was born in the house of Bardiya Sarkar in Matlab South Upazila of Chandpur district in 1927. His father is the late Hasan Ali Sarkar. After passing Bardiya Highs School in 1939, Matlabganj JB. He entered seventh grade in high school. He passed Matriculation from Matlab School and Comilla Victoria Government College in Intermediate Examination. He completed a master's degree from the University of Dhaka with the highest number in political science and economics. 'Mr. Siddiqui is one of the students who protested when Jinnah declared that 'Urdu will be the only state language of Pakistan'.

== Career ==
Although Siddique started his first career as a teacher, he joined the Royal Pakistan Air Force in 3 and served as the Recruiting Officer of the East Pakistan Air Force after serving in various airbases. At that time, his birthplace recruited many youths into the Pakistan Air Force. He voluntarily retired from the Air Force and participated actively in all movements and activities related to the interests of Bengalis. He was elected president of Bangladesh Awami League's largest Matlab police station (undivided Matlab) and vice-president of Chandpur sub-division Awami League. When the liberation struggle started, he served as the chief organizer of the Chandpur division. He was elected MPA, MCA.

In the 1979 Bangladeshi general election, he was elected member of parliament for the Comilla-21 constituency. In the June 1996 Bangladeshi general election, Siddique stood, unsuccessfully, for Chandpur-3. He was the president of several institutions, including Matlab College, Matlab College, in his career. He established two colleges, several high schools and half a hundred primary schools in the area. He played an active role in establishing and promoting the famous 'International Liberal Center' of the concept.

== Death ==
He died on 3 September 2012 at the Combined Military Hospital (CMH) in Dhaka. The dead body of the former MP was buried at the Bardiya her house in South Upazila at the end of the first communion before the Jatio Shangshad Bhaban.
