= University of South Asia =

University of South Asia may refer to the following:

- University of South Asia (Bangladesh)
- University of South Asia (Pakistan)

== See also ==
- South Asian University Delhi, India; established by the South Asian Association for Regional Cooperation (SAARC)
