= Shafiqul Islam (Sirajganj politician) =

Bangladeshi politician

- শফিকুল ইসলাম

Member of Parliament for Sirajganj-1
- In office 3 March 1988 – 6 December 1990
- Preceded by: Mohammed Nasim
- Succeeded by: Mohammed Nasim

Personal details
- Born: Sirajganj
- Party: Jatiya Party

Shafiqul Islam is a politician from Sirajganj District of Bangladesh. He was elected a member of parliament from Sirajganj-1 in the 1988 Bangladeshi general election.

== Career ==
Shafiqul Islam was elected a member of parliament from Sirajganj-1 constituency as an independent candidate in the 1988 Bangladeshi general election.
