= Shamsul Alam (economist) =

Bangladeshi economist (born 1951)

- শামসুল আলম
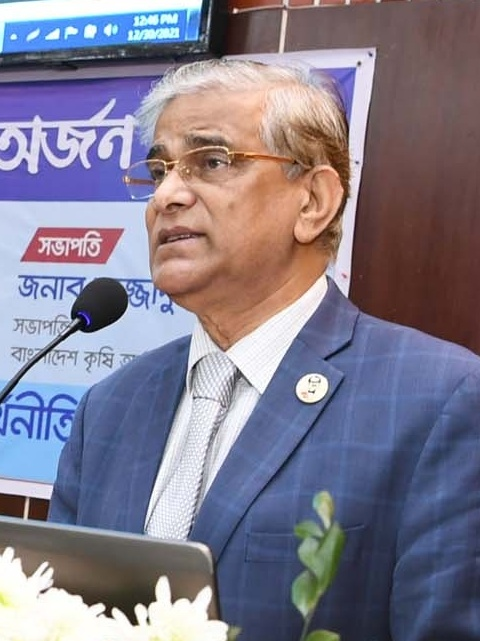
- Alam in 2021 (Dhaka)

Minister of State for Planning
- In office 18 July 2021 – 29 November 2023
- Prime Minister: Sheikh Hasina
- Succeeded by: Zonayed Saki

Advisory Council Member of Bangladesh Awami League
- Incumbent
- Assumed office 24 May 2022

Personal details
- Born: 1 January 1951 (age 75) Matlab North, Chandpur, Bangladesh
- Education: Bangladesh Agricultural University; Thammasat University; Newcastle University
- Occupation: Economist
- Awards: full list

Shamsul Alam (born 1 January 1951) is a Bangladeshi economist, and a former State Minister of Planning of Bangladesh from 19 July 2021 until 19 November 2023. He retired as a member and the Senior Secretary of the Bangladesh Planning Commission. He is also one of the syndicate members of Sylhet Agricultural University. In recognition of his contribution in economics, the government of Bangladesh awarded him the country's second highest civilian award Ekushey Padak in 2020. He is the member of Awami league Advisory council. He was detained by the Detective Branch of police on 19 June 2025 in Mohammadpur, Dhaka.

== Early life ==
Alam was born on 1 January 1951 at Matlab Uttar in Chandpur of the then East Bengal (now Bangladesh). He graduated in 1965 from the then East Pakistan Agricultural University (now Bangladesh Agricultural University) with a degree in agricultural economics and received his post-graduate degree in 1973. In 1983, he received a post-graduate degree in economics from Thammasat University and obtained his PhD in the same subject from Newcastle University in 1991.

== Career ==
Alam served as a faculty member of Bangladesh Agricultural University during 1974–2009. He worked as a member of General Economics Division (GED) from 2009 until 30 June 2021.

== Awards ==
- Ekushey Padak (2020)
- Economist of Influence Award (2018)
- Rebel Poet Kazi Nazrul Islam Memorial Medal (2018)
