= Mirza Muraduzzaman =

Bangladeshi politician (1939–1995)

- মির্জা মুরাদুজ্জামান

Member of Parliament in Sirajganj-2
- In office 1991–1995
- Preceded by: Iqbal Hassan Mahmood
- Succeeded by: Mohammed Nasim

Personal details
- Died: 18 July 1995
- Party: Bangladesh Nationalist Party
- Other political affiliations: National Awami Party
- Occupation: Politician

Mirza Muraduzzaman (Bengali: মির্জা মুরাদুজ্জামান; died 18 July 1995) was a Bangladesh Nationalist Party politician and a member of parliament for Sirajganj-2.

== Career ==
Muraduzzaman was elected to parliament from Sirajganj-2 as a Bangladesh Nationalist Party candidate in 1991.

== Death ==
Mirza Muraduzzaman died on 18 July 1995.
