= Sirajganj-2 =

Constituency of Bangladesh's Jatiya Sangsad

Coordinates: 24.45°N 89.70°E

- Constituency for the Jatiya Sangsad
- District: Sirajganj District
- Division: Rajshahi Division
- Electorate: 351,121 (2018)

Current constituency
- Created: 1984
- Party: Bangladesh Nationalist Party
- Member: Iqbal Hassan Mahmood
- ← 62 Sirajganj-1 63 Sirajganj-3 →

Sirajganj-2 is a constituency represented in the Jatiya Sangsad (National Parliament) of Bangladesh since 2026 by Iqbal Hassan Mahmood of the Bangladesh Nationalist Party.

== Boundaries ==
The constituency encompasses Kamarkhanda Upazila, Sirajganj Municipality, and five union parishads of Sirajganj Sadar Upazila: Kalia Haripur, Kaoakola, Khoksabari, Saidabad, and Shialkul.

== History ==
The constituency was created in 1984 from a Pabna constituency when the former Pabna District was split into two districts: Sirajganj and Pabna.

Ahead of the 2008 general election, the Election Commission redrew constituency boundaries to reflect population changes revealed by the 2001 Bangladesh census. The 2008 redistricting altered the boundaries of the constituency.

Ahead of the 2018 general election, the Election Commission reduced the boundaries of the constituency by removing one union parishad of Sirajganj Sadar Upazila: Bahuli.

Ahead of the 2026 general election, the Election Commission decided to return the boundaries to how it was for the 2008 general election.

== Members of Parliament ==
Election	Member	Party
1986	Iqbal Hassan Mahmood	Jatiya Party
1988	Iqbal Hassan Mahmood	Jatiya Party
1991	Mirza Muraduzzaman	Bangladesh Nationalist Party
1996	Mohammed Nasim	Awami League
2001	Iqbal Hassan Mahmood	Bangladesh Nationalist Party
2008	Rumana Mahmood	Bangladesh Nationalist Party
2014	Md. Habibe Millat	Awami League
2024	Jannat Ara Henry	Awami League
2026	Iqbal Hassan Mahmood	Bangladesh Nationalist Party

== Elections ==
=== Elections in the 2010s ===
Md. Habibe Millat was elected unopposed in the 2014 general election after opposition parties withdrew their candidacies in a boycott of the election.

=== Elections in the 2000s ===
General Election 2008: Sirajganj-2
Party	Candidate	Votes	%	±%
BNP	Rumana Mahmood	128,432	47.9	−7.2
AL	Jannat Ara Henry	126,311	47.2	+3.7
BJP	M. A. Motin	5,718	2.1	N/A
JP(E)	Aminul Islam Jhantu	2,981	1.1	N/A
Independent	Masudur Rahman	1,978	0.7	N/A
BSD	Abu Bakar Bhuiyan	926	0.3	N/A
CPB	Md. Ismail Hossain	580	0.2	N/A
IAB	Md. Ziaul Haque	389	0.1	N/A
United Citizen Movement	Monjur Alam	305	0.1	N/A
Jatiya Samajtantrik Dal-JSD	Md. Abdul Aziz Talukder	243	0.1	N/A
Majority		2,121	0.8	−10.8
Turnout		267,863	87.7	+10.6
BNP hold				

General Election 2001: Sirajganj-2
Party	Candidate	Votes	%	±%
BNP	Iqbal Hassan Mahmood	138,640	55.1	+25.4
AL	Mohammed Nasim	109,482	43.5	+4.9
IJOF	Md. Lutfar Rahman	2,654	1.1	N/A
Independent	Muhammad Salim	534	0.2	N/A
Bangladesh Samajtantrik Dal (Basad-Khalekuzzaman)	Abu Bakar Bhuiyan	499	0.2	N/A
Majority		29,158	11.6	+2.7
Turnout		251,809	77.1	−2.7
BNP gain from AL				

=== Elections in the 1990s ===
General Election June 1996: Sirajganj-2
Party	Candidate	Votes	%	±%
AL	Mohammed Nasim	68,598	38.6	+8.9
BNP	AKM Samsul Alamin	52,709	29.7	−11.2
JP(E)	Abdul Motin	32,515	18.3	+16.3
Jamaat	Abdul Latif	22,795	12.8	−10.9
Zaker Party	Amin Koraishee	431	0.2	−0.2
Bangladesh Samajtantrik Dal (Khalekuzzaman)	Abu Bakar Bhuiyan	407	0.2	N/A
FP	Md. Azizur Rahman Shudagar	182	0.1	N/A
Majority		15,889	8.9	−2.4
Turnout		177,637	79.8	+23.9
AL gain from BNP				

General Election 1991: Sirajganj-2
Party	Candidate	Votes	%	±%
BNP	Mirza Muraduzzaman	58,437	40.9	
AL	Motahar Hossain Tang	42,376	29.7	
Jamaat	Abdul Aziz Azad	33,881	23.7	
JSD	Abdul Hai Tang	3,356	2.4	
JP(E)	Abul Hasnat Gofran	2,894	2.0	
BKA	Abdul Mannan	920	0.6	
Zaker Party	Md. Nazrul Islam	515	0.4	
Independent	Shahjahan Ali	347	0.2	
Majority		16,061	11.3	
Turnout		142,726	55.9	
BNP gain from JP(E)				
