= S. A. Bari =

Bangladeshi politician

Deputy Prime Minister of Bangladesh
- In office 23 August 1979 – 27 November 1981 Serving with Moudud Ahmed (1979-1980), Jamal Uddin Ahmad (1979-1981)
- Prime Minister: Shah Azizur Rahman
- Preceded by: A. Q. M. Badruddoza Chowdhury
- Succeeded by: post abolished

Member of the Bangladesh Parliament for Dinajpur-8
- In office 2 April 1979 – 24 March 1982
- Preceded by: Shah Mahatab Ahmad
- Succeeded by: redistricted

Personal details
- Born: 28 March 1927 Dinajpur, Bengal Province
- Died: 3 March 1987 (aged 59) Dhaka
- Party: Bangladesh Nationalist Party
- Other political affiliations: National Awami Party (Bhashani)
- Awards: Independence Award (2002)

S. A. Bari (1927–1987) was a Bangladesh Nationalist Party politician and Deputy Prime Minister of Bangladesh.

== Early life ==
Bari was born on 28 March 1927 in Dinajpur, East Bengal, British Raj. He was involved in student politics. Bari was the first vice president of Dhaka University Central Students' Union who was elected directly by the students' votes.

== Career ==
Bari joined the Civil Liberty League in 1951. He was involved with the Bengali language movement and was imprisoned for it. He was arrested again in 1955. He helped found the East Pakistan Students Union and in 1951 became a founding member of Jubo League. He worked as a lawyer at the Dinajpur bar. He helped found the Dinajpur Law College. He was active with the protests against military dictator General Ayub Khan. He helped organize the 1969 mass uprising.

In 1971, after the start of the Bangladesh Liberation War, he joined the Mujib Bahini. He was made in-charge of the Dalimga camp of the Mujib Bahini.

He first sought election to parliament, unsuccessfully, in 1973 as a National Awami Party (Bhashani) candidate. In 1977, he was elected secretary general of the party.

In the 1979 Bangladeshi general election, he stood successfully as a Bangladesh Nationalist Party candidate for the Dinajpur-8 constituency. He served as the Minister of Manpower and Social Welfare in the cabinet of President Ziaur Rahman. He also served as the Deputy Prime Minister.

== Death ==
Bari died on 3 March 1987.
