= Muhammad Habibe Millat =

Bangladeshi politician

- মোঃ হাবিবে মিল্লাত

Member of the Bangladesh Parliament for Sirajganj-2
- In office 29 January 2014 – 29 January 2024
- Preceded by: Rumana Mahmood
- Succeeded by: Jannat Ara Henry

Personal details
- Born: 15 January 1966 (age 60) Sirajganj, East Pakistan, Pakistan
- Party: Bangladesh Awami League
- Spouse: Sharita Millat
- Relatives: Khandaker Mosharraf Hossain (father-in-law); Khandaker Nurul Islam (grandfather-in-law)
- Education: Mymensingh Medical College; Royal College of Surgeons of Edinburgh
- Profession: Cardiac surgeon, politician
- Website: mhmillat.com

Muhammad Habibe Millat Munna (born 15 January 1966) is a cardiac surgeon, Bangladesh Awami League politician, and a former Jatiya Sangsad member from the Sirajganj-2 constituency.

== Early life ==
Millat was born on 15 January 1966. He obtained his MBBS degree from the Mymensingh Medical College in Bangladesh and FRCS degree from the Royal College of Surgeons of Edinburgh. He is also trained in advanced cardiothoracic surgery from Europe's leading hospitals and in Harvard Medical School in Boston.

== Career ==
Millat was elected a member of the Bangladesh Parliament from the Sirajganj-2 constituency for the 2014–2018 session. He was re-elected from the constituency for the 2019-2024 session. He was elected president of advisory group on health of the Inter Parliamentary Union in June 2015. He has a number of scientific articles published in international medical journals.

On 26 November 2023, the Awami League announced the final list of its 298 candidates to contest the 2024 national election which did not include Millat.

Millat's house was burned down on 18 November 2026 along with homes of fellow Awami League politicians.

== Positions held ==
Millat has also been involved in numerous national and international organizations. He is also the champion of stopping child marriage and drug abuse, promoting health security for all, women and youth empowerment. Some of his current engagement mention below:

- Chairman, Health Advisory Group, Inter-Parliamentary Union (IPU)
- Vice Chairman, Bangladesh Red Crescent Society (BDRCS)
- Vice Chairman, Bangladesh Medical Research Council (BMRC)
- Member, Standing Committee, Ministry of Foreign Affairs
- Member, Standing Committee, Ministry of Science and Technology
- Governing Board Member, International Federation of Red Cross & Red Crescent Society (IFRC)
- Member, Bangladesh Association of Parliamentarians on Population & Development (BAPPD)
- Member, Commonwealth Parliamentary Association (CPA), Bangladesh Chapter
- Central Committee Member, Swadhinata Chikitsak Parishad (SWACHIP)
- Senate Member, Rabindra University, Bangladesh
- Professor, Cardiac Surgery, Ibrahim Cardiac Hospital, Dhaka
- Goodwill Ambassador, Bangladesh National Cadet Corps (BNCC)
- Advisor, SANDHANI Central Committee
