= Iqbal Hassan Mahmood =

Bangladeshi politician and industrialist (born 1950)

- ইকবাল হাসান মাহমুদ
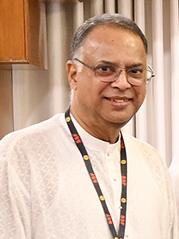
- Mahmood in 2025

Minister of Power, Energy and Mineral Resources
- Incumbent
- Assumed office 17 February 2026
- President: Mohammed Shahabuddin; Hafiz Uddin Ahmad (acting); Mirza Fakhrul Islam Alamgir
- Prime Minister: Tarique Rahman
- Preceded by: Muhammad Fouzul Kabir Khan (as adviser)

Member of the Bangladesh Parliament for Sirajganj-2
- Incumbent
- Assumed office 17 February 2026
- Preceded by: Jannat Ara Henry
- In office 28 October 2001 – 27 October 2006
- Preceded by: Mohammed Nasim
- Succeeded by: Rumana Mahmood
- In office 10 July 1986 – 6 December 1990
- Preceded by: Constituency created
- Succeeded by: Mirza Muraduzzaman

State Minister of Power
- In office 10 October 2001 – 20 May 2006
- Prime Minister: Khaleda Zia
- Preceded by: Rafiqul Islam
- Succeeded by: Anwarul Kabir Talukdar

State Minister of Agriculture
- In office 21 May 2006 – 29 October 2006
- Prime Minister: Khaleda Zia
- Preceded by: Mirza Fakhrul Islam Alamgir
- Succeeded by: Sultan Salauddin Tuku

Personal details
- Born: 10 May 1950 (age 76) Koyelgati, Sirajganj, East Bengal, Dominion of Pakistan
- Party: Bangladesh Nationalist Party (1990–present)
- Other political affiliations: Jatiya Party (1986–1990)
- Spouse: Rumana Mahmood
- Children: 2
- Parent: Abdullah al Mahmood (father)
- Relatives: M. A. Matin (brother-in-law); M. A. Muhit (nephew)
- Education: University of Dhaka
- Occupation: Politician; Industrialist

Iqbal Hassan Mahmood (Bengali: ইকবাল হাসান মাহমুদ; born 10 May 1950), also known as Tuku, is a Bangladeshi politician and industrialist. A member of the Bangladesh Nationalist Party (BNP) National Standing Committee, he has been elected to the Jatiya Sangsad from Sirajganj-2 on four occasions and has served as the minister of power, energy and mineral resources since February 2026. He previously served as state minister of power from 2001 to 2006 and as state minister of agriculture in 2006.

== Early life and education ==
Mahmood was born on 10 May 1950 into a Bengali Muslim family of Taluqdars in the village of Koyelgati in Sheyalkol Union, Sirajganj, the son of Abdullah al Mahmood and Abeda Khatun. His father was a politician who served as the minister of industries and natural resources of Pakistan.

Mahmood completed his early education in Sirajganj before studying at the University of Dhaka, where he earned a bachelor's degree in sociology with honours and later completed a master's degree in 1975 with honours.

== Business career ==
Mahmood built his business career through the Apex Group, where he was a founding director and held senior executive roles in several of its export-oriented companies. He was among the early Bangladeshi industrialists involved in exporting garment products to Europe, and was associated with the group's expansion into textiles, leather and footwear, frozen foods, and home textiles. Within the group, he served as managing director of Apex Weaving & Finishing Mills Limited and held senior positions at Apex Tannery Limited, Apex Foods Limited, and Apex Spinning & Knitting Mills Limited.

Outside the private sector, Mahmood served as a director of Bangladesh Shilpa Rin Sangstha, the state industrial financing institution, and was president of the Dhaka Chamber of Commerce and Industry.

== Political career ==
=== Student politics and Liberation War ===
As a student, Mahmood was active in the East Pakistan Students' Union and took part in the 11-point movement of 1969 against the government of Ayub Khan. He later fought in the Bangladesh Liberation War in 1971.

=== Parliament and cabinet ===
Mahmood was first elected to parliament from Sirajganj-2 as a Jatiya Party candidate in 1986 and was re-elected in 1988. After the fall of Hussain Muhammad Ershad in 1990, he joined the Bangladesh Nationalist Party.

He returned to parliament from Sirajganj-2 in the 2001 general election. In the cabinet of Prime Minister Khaleda Zia, he served as state minister of power from October 2001 to May 2006 and as state minister of agriculture from May to October 2006.

On 19 June 2019, Mahmood was made a member of the BNP National Standing Committee.

In the 2026 general election, Mahmood was again elected from Sirajganj-2. On 17 February 2026, he was sworn in as minister of power, energy and mineral resources in the cabinet of Prime Minister Tarique Rahman.

== Legal proceedings and exile ==
In March 2007, after a military coup and amid the 2006-2008 political crisis, the Anti-Corruption Commission (ACC) filed a case against Mahmood, alleging that he had amassed ৳2.57 crore through illegal means and concealed information in his wealth statement. On 15 November 2007, a special court convicted him and sentenced him to nine years' imprisonment and a fine of ৳50 lakh.

Mahmood appealed the verdict. In June 2011, the High Court Division acquitted him of the charges, but in January 2014, during the Sheikh Hasina government, the ACC appealed and the Appellate Division set aside the acquittal and ordered a fresh hearing.

In May 2023, the High Court again upheld the conviction and original sentence. BNP leaders claim this was a politically motivated false conviction. After the judgment was released, Mahmood went into exile. After the July Uprising, in October 2024, he returned to Bangladesh.

In September 2025, the Appellate Division acquitted Mahmood of all charges, overturning the conviction.

== Personal life ==
Mahmood is married to Rumana Mahmood, a former member of parliament. They have a son and a daughter. His brother-in-law was former deputy prime minister M. A. Matin, and Matin's son M. A. Muhit is Mahmood's nephew. In 2026, Mahmood and Muhit joined the cabinet of Prime Minister Tarique Rahman. Mahmood's daughter is married to the son of Sheikh Selim.
