= Md. Nurul Huda =

Bangladeshi politician (1949–2017)

Mohammad Nurul Huda

Member of Parliament (Chandpur-2)
- In office 1991–1995
- Preceded by: Shamsul Haque
- Succeeded by: Mofazzal Hossain Chowdhury
- In office 2001–2008
- Preceded by: Mofazzal Hossain Chowdhury
- Succeeded by: Rafiqul Islam Miah

Personal details
- Born: 5 April 1949 Matlab North, Chandpur
- Died: 25 January 2017 (aged 67) New York City
- Party: Bangladesh Nationalist Party

Mohammad Nurul Huda (5 April 1949 – 25 January 2017) was a Bangladeshi politician. He was elected as a member of parliament from the Chandpur-2 (Matlab North and South) constituency in the 2nd, 5th, 6th, and 8th general elections. He was a former vice-chairman of the central executive committee of the Bangladesh Nationalist Party and a member of BNP chairperson Khaleda Zia's advisory council. In 1991, he served as the minister of state for Information and Establishment (now Public Administration) in Khaleda Zia's first cabinet.

== Career ==
Md. Nurul Huda became involved in politics while still in school. He was general secretary of the Chhatra League at Comilla Victoria College. He earned an M.A. in economics from Dhaka University. In 1969, he was the convener of the Greater Comilla District Sarbadaliya Chatra Sangram Parisad (all-party student struggle council). During the War of Independence in 1971, he was appointed as deputy commander of the Greater Comilla District Bangladesh Liberation Force (BLF). In 1973, he joined as the first BCS cadre (admin) of independent Bangladesh. He left the government service and participated in the 2nd general election of Bangladesh held on 1 February 1979 and became a member of parliament as an independent candidate from the then Comilla-20 constituency at the age of 28. On 4 April of the same year (1979), he joined the Bangladesh Nationalist Party (BNP).

He was elected as a member of parliament from the Chandpur-2 constituency in 1991, 1996 and 2001, as a Bangladesh Nationalist Party (BNP) candidate. For the first six months of 1991, he served as the minister of state for information and for the next two years, as the minister of state for establishment.

== Death ==
Huda died on 25 January 2017 in New York City, United States. He left behind his wife, Khushi Akhter, and his two sons, Tanvir Huda and Sanvir Huda.
