= Abdullah al Mahmood =

Bengali politician and lawyer

- আব্দুল্লাহ আল মাহমুদ
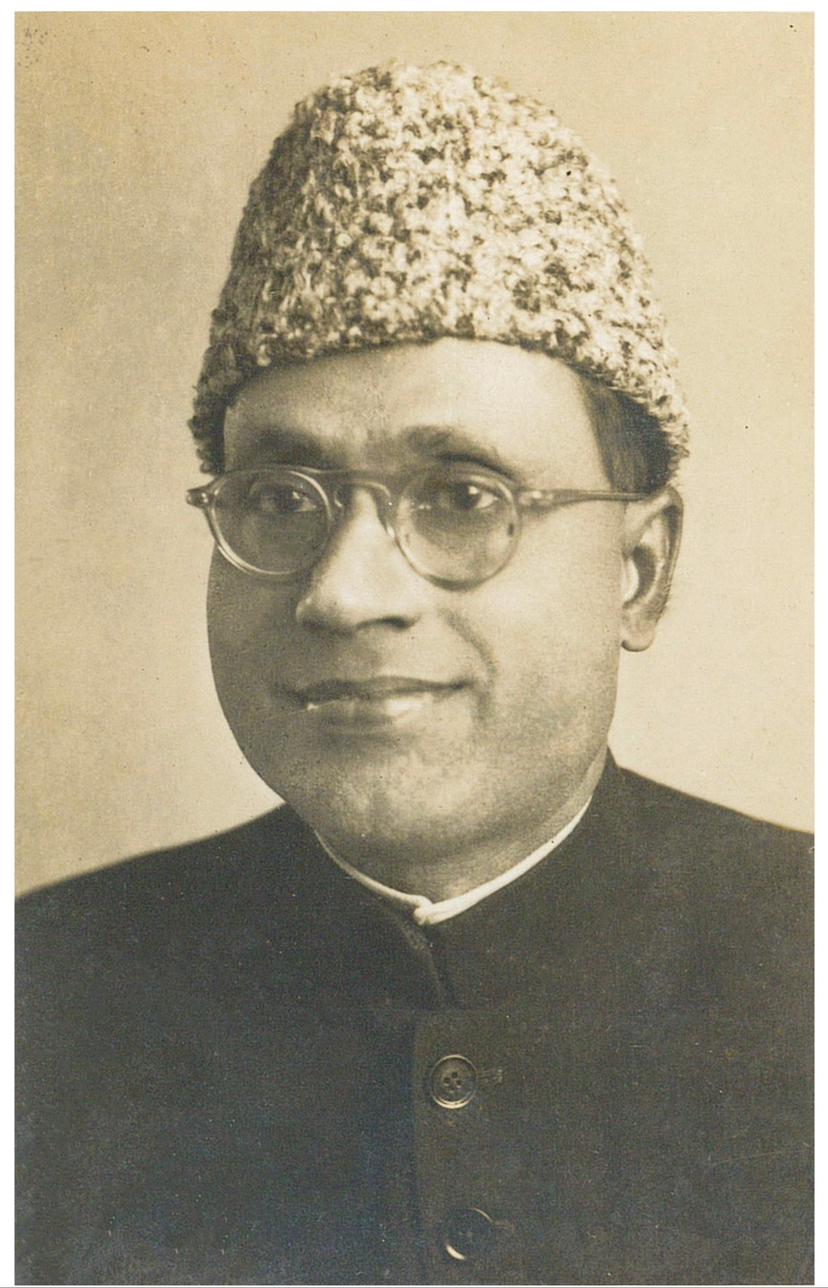

Minister of Industries and Natural Resources
- In office 4 September 1963 – 20 March 1965
- President: Ayub Khan
- Preceded by: Zulfikar Ali Bhutto
- Succeeded by: Altaf Hussain

Member of the National Assembly of Pakistan
- In office 1965–1969
- Preceded by: Syed Hussain Mansur
- Constituency: Pabna-II

Member of the National Assembly of Pakistan
- In office 1962–1965
- Succeeded by: M. A. Matin
- Constituency: Pabna-III

Member of the Constituent Assembly of Pakistan
- In office 1947–1954
- Constituency: East Bengal

Member of the Bengal Legislative Assembly
- In office 1937–1945
- Succeeded by: Osman Ghani
- Constituency: Serajganj North

Personal details
- Born: 4 April 1900 Koyelgati, Sirajganj, Bengal Presidency, British India
- Died: 13 June 1975 (aged 75) Sirajganj, Bangladesh
- Party: All-India Muslim League; Muslim League; Convention Muslim League
- Children: Iqbal Hassan Mahmood
- Relatives: M. A. Matin (son-in-law); M. A. Muhit (grandson); Rumana Mahmood (daughter-in-law)
- Education: University of Calcutta
- Occupation: Politician, lawyer

Abdullah al Mahmood (Bengali: আব্দুল্লাহ আল মাহমুদ; 4 April 1900 – 13 June 1975) was a Bengali politician and lawyer who served as the central minister of industries and natural resources of Pakistan. He also served as a member of the Bengal Legislative Assembly, a member of the Constituent Assembly of Pakistan, and a member of the National Assembly of Pakistan.

== Early life and education ==
Mahmood was born on 4 April 1900, in the village of Koyelgati, in present-day Sirajganj District. He attended Sirajganj B. L. High School. After passing the entrance examination, he enrolled at Carmichael College in Rangpur in 1915 and completed his intermediate of arts (IA) in 1918. He then studied at Calcutta Islamia College, from which he graduated with a Bachelor of Arts (BA) in Philosophy in 1920, and then completed a Master of Arts (MA) in Arabic in 1923 and a Bachelor of Laws (LLB) in 1925 from the University of Calcutta.

== Career ==
=== Legal and educational career ===
Mahmood began his career as a lawyer in 1924. He was a founding member of Sirajganj College. He also served as a member of the University of Dhaka Court from 1940 to 1951 and of its Executive Council from 1947, and was a member of the first syndicate of Rajshahi University. He was associated with the Central Cooperative Bank, serving as a director and later as chairman. He also served on the Indian Central Jute Committee and on the advisory board of the Imperial Council of Agricultural Research from 1945 to 1947.

=== Muslim League politics in British India ===
Mahmood entered politics through the All-India Muslim League. He was elected to the Bengal Legislative Assembly in 1937 and Indian Legislative Council in 1946. Contemporary and later accounts describe him as part of Muslim League politics in Bengal throughout the late 1930s and 1940s. During this period, the British colonial authorities offered him the honorary title of Khan Bahadur, however, he declined the title because of his involvement in the non-cooperation movement.

From 1943 to 1945, Mahmood served as parliamentary secretary in the Bengal government in the Civil Supplies and Food Department. During this period, he worked in the provincial political milieu associated with Huseyn Shaheed Suhrawardy and Khawaja Nazimuddin. In 1942 he was elected assistant secretary of the Bengal Provincial Muslim League Working Committee and became a member of the All-India Muslim League Council. He served as assistant secretary of the Bengal Provincial Muslim League from 1942 to 1948 and as president of the Pabna District Muslim League from 1942 to 1948. He was also a member of the Pabna District Board and chairman of Sirajganj Municipality from 1937 to 1949.

Mahmood represented Sirajganj at the Lahore session of the Muslim League in March 1940 and was later appointed convener of an All-India Muslim League conference in 1942. He was the only elected Bengal member present at a meeting of the Muslim League Executive Committee in Lucknow.

In 1945, Mahmood became the first Indian to be appointed chairman of the London-based Imperial Jute Committee. He also served in the Indian legislature in 1946 as a Muslim League politician from Bengal.

=== Pakistan period ===
After the Partition of India, Mahmood became a member of the Constituent Assembly of Pakistan and served in Pakistan's first legislature. In May 1948, he was appointed joint chief whip.

On 14 November 1948, Mahmood was appointed deputy high commissioner of Pakistan in India, and he served in that office until 1952.

Mahmood later returned to the National Assembly during the Ayub Khan era. He was elected from Pabna-III to the 3rd National Assembly of Pakistan and from Pabna-II to the 4th National Assembly of Pakistan. From 4 September 1963 to 20 March 1965, he served in the cabinet of Ayub Khan as minister of industries and natural resources. He retired from politics in 1969 due to old age.

== Family ==
Mahmood's eldest son, Iqbal Hassan Mahmood, is the current minister of power, energy and mineral resources of Bangladesh; he also served as the state minister for power and state minister for agriculture in previous terms. His daughter, Tasmina Mahmood, was a physician and the wife of M. A. Matin, who served as deputy prime minister of Bangladesh and held many other ministerial portfolios. Mahmood's grandson, M. A. Muhit, is the state minister of health and family welfare of Bangladesh.

His youngest son, Manzur Hasan Mahmood Khushi, was a former chairman of the Sirajganj Municipality. His eldest daughter was Tahmina Mahmood, the wife of physicist Mahboobur Rahman Chowdhury, who served as an additional secretary in the ministries of education and planning. His youngest daughter was Tahsina Morshed, the wife of Mohammad Golam Morshed, a lawyer, social worker and former governor of Lions Clubs International.

== Death and legacy ==
Mahmood died in Sirajganj on 13 June 1975. The road of his residence in Sirajganj, Al Mahmood Avenue, is named after him.
