= Tanvir Shakil Joy =

Bangladeshi politician

- তানভীর শাকিল জয়

Member of the Bangladesh Parliament for Sirajganj-1
- In office 12 November 2020 – 6 August 2024
- Preceded by: Mohammed Nasim
- Succeeded by: Md. Salim Reza
- In office 25 January 2009 – 24 January 2014
- Preceded by: Mohammed Nasim
- Succeeded by: Mohammed Nasim

Personal details
- Born: 1 August 1976 (age 50)
- Party: Bangladesh Awami League
- Parent: Mohammed Nasim (father)

Tanvir Shakil Joy (born 1 August 1976) is a Bangladesh Awami League politician and a former Jatiya Sangsad member representing the Sirajganj-1 constituency.

== Career ==
In April 2007, illegal VoIP equipment allegedly owned by Joy was seized by the Rapid Action Battalion from a house in Bashabo, Dhaka.

Joy was elected to parliament in 2008 from Sirajganj-1 as a Bangladesh Awami League candidate.

In 2016, he was one of the organisers of a rally of Bangladeshi students protesting Islamic extremism.

After the death of his father, Mohammed Nasim, on 13 June 2020, Joy was elected to fill his seat in the Bangladesh Parliament in the by-election held on 12 November 2020.

== Personal life ==
Joy's father, Mohammed Nasim, was an Awami League politician and former government minister. His grandfather was Captain Muhammad Mansur Ali.
