= Jamal Uddin Ahmad =

Bangladeshi politician

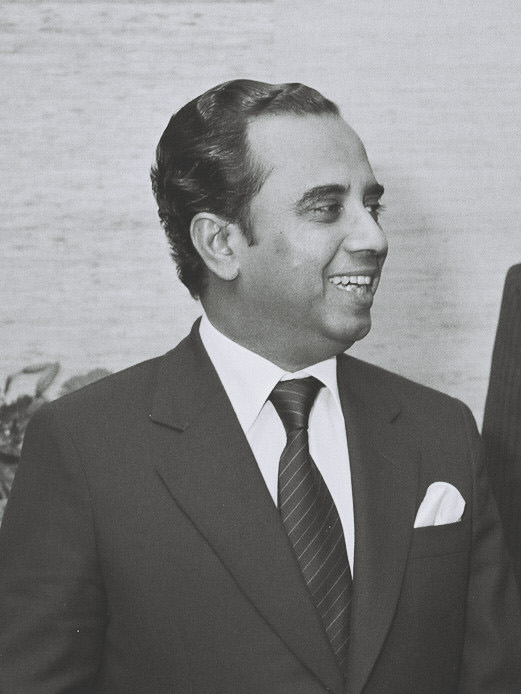
- Ahmad as the Deputy Prime Minister of Bangladesh in Brussels (1981)

Deputy Prime Minister of Bangladesh
- In office 23 August 1979 – 11 February 1982 Serving with Moudud Ahmed (1979–1980) and S. A. Bari (1979–1981)
- Prime Minister: Mashiur Rahman (acting); Shah Azizur Rahman
- Preceded by: A. Q. M. Badruddoza Chowdhury
- Succeeded by: Moudud Ahmed (1986)

Minister of Industries
- In office 10 July 1977 – 12 February 1982
- Preceded by: AKM Hafizuddin
- Succeeded by: Mirza Nurul Huda

Personal details
- Born: 1 March 1932 Fatikchhari Upazila, Chittagong District, Chittagong Division, Bengal Presidency, British India (now Bangladesh)
- Died: 3 January 2015 (aged 82) Baridhara, Dhaka, Bangladesh
- Party: Bangladesh Nationalist Party
- Spouse: Rosy Ahmad
- Children: 2
- Education: University of Dhaka
- Profession: Accountant

Jamal Uddin Ahmad (1 March 1932 – 3 January 2015) was a Bangladeshi politician and accountant. He served as the deputy prime minister of Bangladesh from 1977 until 1982. He also served as the president of the South Asian Federation of Accountants, as well as the president of the Institute of Chartered Accountants of Bangladesh for two terms. He was also on the board of directors of the International Federation of Accountants (IFAC).

== Early life and education ==
He was born on 1 March 1932 in Fatikchhari Upazila, Chittagong District, Chittagong Division, Bengal Presidency, British India (now Bangladesh). He obtained his Bachelor of Commerce degree from University of Dhaka. In 1954, Ahmad received a master's degree in commerce from the University of Dhaka. He then got selected as a Burma Shell scholar and went to London to do his Chartered Accountancy. He was a fellow of Peat Marwick Mitchell and passed the Chartered Accountancy examination the first time from England and Wales. He returned to East Pakistan in 1961.

== Career ==
Upon his return he started his career as a Chartered Accountant. He joined the Cabinet of President Ziaur Rahman in 1977. He was appointed the deputy prime minister of Bangladesh on 23 August 1979. During his tenure in the cabinet he served as the minister of industries. In 1979 Bangladeshi general election he was elected to the Jatiya Sangsad from Chittagong-4.

== Death ==
Ahmad died at his home in the Baridhara neighborhood in Dhaka on 3 January 2015, at the age of 82. His first funeral prayer was held at the Gulshan Azad Mosque in Gulshan Thana with burial at a family cemetery in Daulatpur union, Fatikchhari Upazila, Chittagong District.
