= Mohammed Nasim =

Bangladeshi politician (1948–2020)

- মোহাম্মদ নাসিম
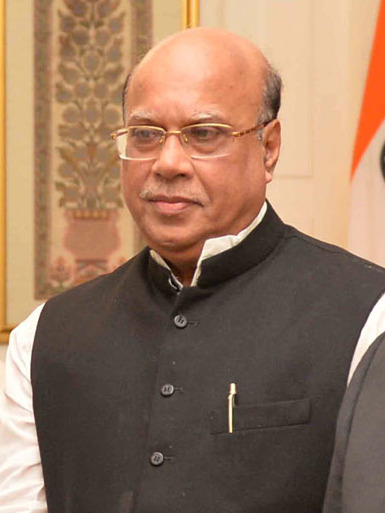
- Nasim at Rashtrapati Bhavan, New Delhi (2016)

Minister of Health and Family Welfare
- In office 12 January 2014 – 6 January 2019
- Preceded by: AFM Ruhal Haque
- Succeeded by: Zahid Maleque

Minister of Home Affairs
- In office 12 March 1999 – 15 July 2001
- Preceded by: Rafiqul Islam
- Succeeded by: Altaf Hossain Chowdhury

Minister of Post and Telecommunication
- In office 23 June 1996 – 15 July 2001
- Preceded by: M Keramat Ali

Member of Parliament
- In office 9 January 2014 – 13 June 2020
- Preceded by: Tanvir Shakil Joy
- Succeeded by: Tanvir Shakil Joy
- In office 28 October 2001 – 27 October 2006
- Preceded by: Mohammad Selim
- In office 5 March 1991 – 24 November 1995
- Preceded by: Shafiqul Islam
- In office 10 July 1986 – 6 December 1987
- Constituency: Sirajganj-1
- In office 23 June 1996 – 15 July 2001
- Preceded by: Mirza Muraduzzaman
- Succeeded by: Iqbal Hassan Mahmood
- Constituency: Sirajganj-2

Personal details
- Born: 2 April 1948 Qazipur, East Bengal, Pakistan
- Died: 13 June 2020 (aged 72) Dhaka, Bangladesh
- Cause of death: COVID-19
- Party: Bangladesh Awami League
- Spouse: Laila Arjumand
- Children: 3, including Tanvir Shakil Joy
- Parent: Muhammad Mansur Ali (father)
- Relatives: Mohammad Selim (brother)
- Education: Jagannath College

Mohammed Nasim (2 April 1948 – 13 June 2020) was a Bangladesh Awami League politician who served as Bangladesh's minister of home affairs and minister of health and family welfare during 1999–2001 and 2014–2019, respectively. He was a six-term Jatiya Sangsad member representing the Sirajganj-1 and Sirajganj-2 constituencies. He was a presidium member of Awami League and the spokesperson of the 14-party alliance.

== Early life ==
Nasim was born on 2 April 1948, to a Bengali Muslim family of Sarkars hailing from Kuripara in Qazipur, Sirajganj (then under Pabna District), Bengal Presidency. His parents were Muhammad Mansur Ali and Amena Monsur. Ali served as the 3rd prime minister of Bangladesh in 1975, and was one of the four leaders killed in the Dhaka Central Jail as a part of the coup d'état on 7 November 1975.

He studied at Edward College in Pabna. He was a leader of Chhatra Union, the student wing of Communist Party. In 1966, Sheikh Mujibur Rahman went to Pabna for six point movement rally after which he visited the home of Mansur Ali where he learned Nasim was a leader of Chhatra Union. At Rahman's request, Nasim attended a program of Chhatra League, the student wing of Awami League, and subsequently joined the organization. In 1967, Nasim was elected to the Edward College Students' Union.

In 1969, Nasim moved to Dhaka and was admitted to Jagannath College. During the Bangladesh Liberation war, Nasim worked for the Mujibnagar government, the Bangladesh government in exile, in which his father was a minister. He graduated in political science from the college.

== Career ==
Nasim became the joint secretary of Pabna District unit of Awami League after the independence of Bangladesh in 1971. He sought the nomination of Awami League for the 1973 parliamentary election, but lost to a more senior politician. He was made a presidium member of Bangladesh Jubo League, the youth wing of Awami League. Following the formation of BAKSAL in 1975, he was appointed its general secretary. He fled to India after the assassination of Sheikh Mujibur Rahman in the 15 August 1975 Bangladesh coup d'état. His father was arrested and subsequently killed extrajudicially in prison. Nasim was imprisoned on his return to Bangladesh.

In 1982, Nasim was made a presidium member of the Awami League. He was elected to the parliament for the first time in 1986, representing the Sirajganj-1 constituency. He was re-elected in 1996 from the same constituency.

Nasim was appointed public works, post and telecommunications minister in June 1996. He took over the home ministry as well when the incumbent Rafiqul Islam was sacked in March 1999. On 12 November 2006, he was injured after police baton charged a rally of Awami League.

In February 2007, the Anti-Corruption Commission (ACC) published a list of 50 top corrupt suspects which included Nasim's name. The 50 were asked to submit their wealth statements at the ACC office within 72 hours of receiving the notification. Nasim was arrested by the joint forces on 5 February 2007. On 8 October, he was sentenced to 13 years in jail by a special anti-graft court. His wife, Laila Arzumand Banu, was also sentenced to 3 years of imprisonment for aiding him in illegally amassing wealth.

Following the charges and convictions, Nasim did not get the Awami League nomination at the 2008 Bangladeshi general election. Instead, Nasim's son, Tanvir Shakil Joy, got the nomination and won the election.

Nasim was elected to the parliament from Sirajganj-1 in 2014. He was appointed the minister of health and family affairs.

== Personal life and death ==
Nasim and Laila Arjumand Banu had three sons including Tanvir Shakil Joy.

On 1 June 2020, Nasim was hospitalized in Dhaka after testing positive for COVID-19. Four days later, he suffered a cerebral hemorrhage during his treatment. On 13 June, he died while being treated at the hospital.
