= Matlab Dakshin Upazila =

Matlab Dakshin মতলব দক্ষিণ
- Upazila
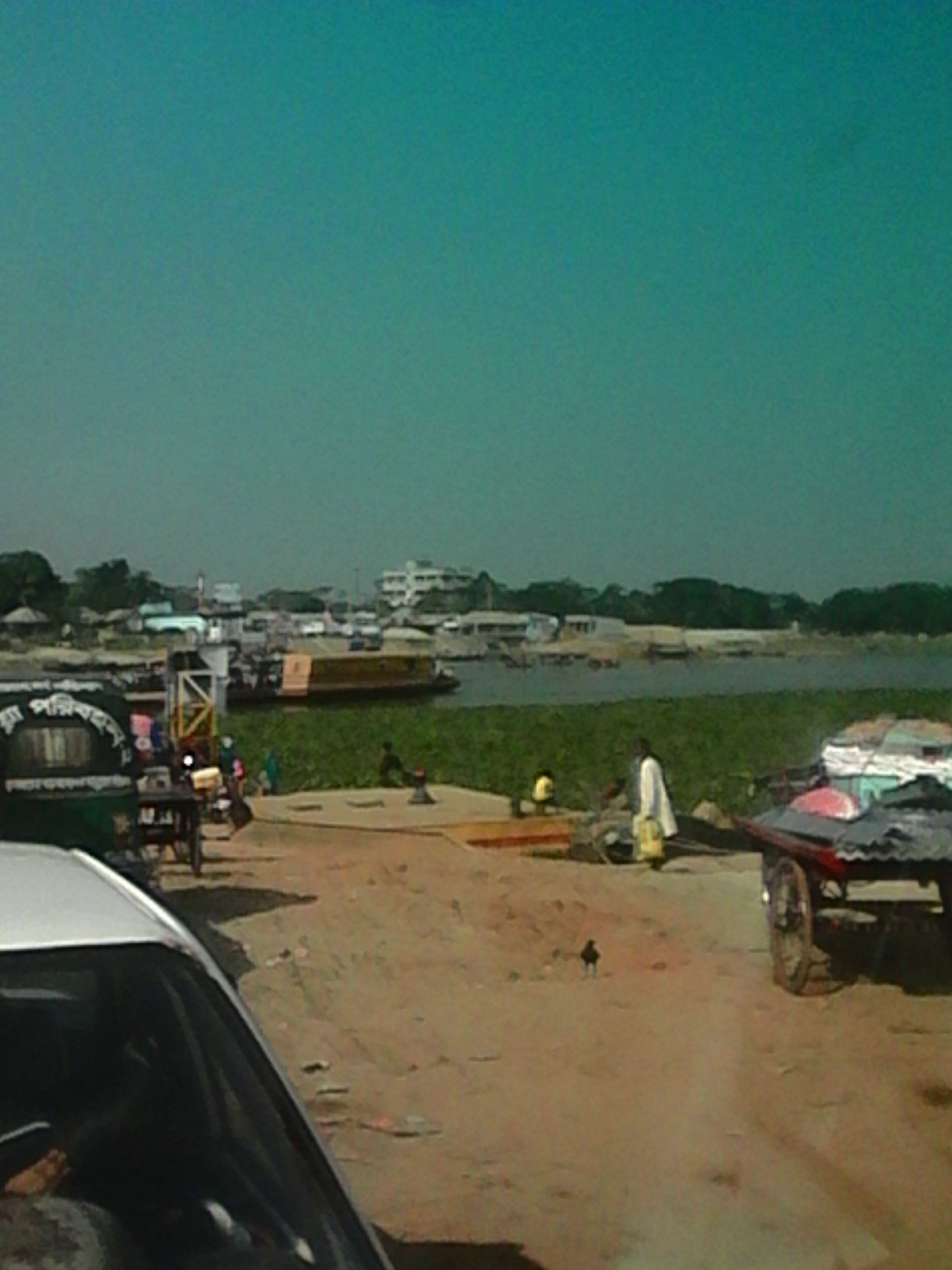
- Ferry Ghat Matlab, Matlab Dakshin

- Coordinates: 23°21′N 90°42.5′E
- Country: Bangladesh
- Division: Chittagong
- District: Chandpur

Government
  - MP (Chandpur-2): Nurul Amin Ruhul
  - Upazila Chairman: B H M Kabir Ahamed

Area
  - Total: 129.32 km^{2} (49.93 sq mi)

Population (2022)
  - Total: 226,721
  - Density: 1,753.2/km^{2} (4,540.7/sq mi)
- Time zone: UTC+6 (BST)
- Postal code: 3640
- Area code: 08426
- Website: http://matlabsouth.chandpur.gov.bd/

Matlab Dakshin Upazila mauza geocode map

Matlab Dakshin (Bengali: মতলব দক্ষিণ, romanized: Motlob Dakshin, lit. 'Matlab South') is an upazila of Chandpur District in the division of Chittagong, Bangladesh. The former Matlab Upazila was bifurcated in 2000, creating Matlab Dakshin and Matlab Uttar upazilas.

== Geography ==
Matlab is located at 23.3500°N 90.7083°E. It has a total land area of 129.32 km^{2}.

== Demographics ==
Religions in Matlab Dakshin Upazila (2022)
Religion	Percent
Islam	91.15%
Hinduism	8.83%
Other or not stated	0.02%

According to the 2022 Bangladeshi census, Matlab Dakkhin Upazila had 55,851 households and a population of 226,721. 10.25% of the population were under 5 years of age. Matlab Dakkhin had a literacy rate (age 7 and over) of 75.82%: 76.28% for males and 75.46% for females, and a sex ratio of 83.27 males for every 100 females. 69,233 (30.54%) lived in urban areas.

According to the 2011 Census of Bangladesh, Matlab Dakshin Upazila had 45,569 households and a population of 210,050. 50,318 (23.96%) were under 10 years of age. Matlab Dakshin had a literacy rate (age 7 and over) of 56.75%, compared to the national average of 51.8%, and a sex ratio of 1149 females per 1000 males. 59,286 (28.22%) lived in urban areas.

== Administration ==
Matlab Dakshin Upazila is divided into 2 municipalities and 5 union parishads.

Municipality:

- Matlab Municipality
- Narayanpur Municipality

Union Parishad:

- Nayergaon Uttar
- Nayergaon Dakshin
- Khadergaon
- Upadi Uttar
- Upadi Dakshin

Matlab Municipality is subdivided into 9 wards and 30 mahallas, and Narayanpur Municipality is subdivided into 9 wards and 24 mahallas.

== Notable people ==
- Shahed Ali Patwary- Deputy Speaker and member of East Pakistan Provincial Assembly.
- A. T. M. Abdul Mateen- Deputy Speaker and Member of the 4th National Assembly of Pakistan as a representative of East Pakistan.
- A. B. Siddique- a drafter of the Constitution of Bangladesh and member of parliament.
- Mohammad Rafiqul Islam - was a former Chief of Bangladesh Air Force and member of parliament.

== See also ==
- Upazilas of Bangladesh
- Districts of Bangladesh
- Divisions of Bangladesh
