= Chandpur-2 =

Constituency of Bangladesh's Jatiya Sangsad

Coordinates: 23.43°N 90.62°E

- Constituency for the Jatiya Sangsad
- District: Chandpur District
- Division: Chittagong Division
- Electorate: 393,346 (2018)

Current constituency
- Created: 1984
- Party: Bangladesh Nationalist Party
- Member: Md. Jalal Uddin
- ← 260 Chandpur-1 262 Chandpur-3 →

Chandpur-2 is a constituency represented in the Jatiya Sangsad (National Parliament) of Bangladesh since 2026 by Md. Jalal Uddin of the Bangladesh Nationalist Party.

== Boundaries ==
The constituency encompasses Matlab Dakshin and Matlab Uttar upazilas.

== History ==
The constituency was created in 1984 from the Comilla-20 constituency when the former Comilla District was split into three districts: Brahmanbaria, Comilla, and Chandpur.

Ahead of the 2008 general election, the Election Commission redrew constituency boundaries to reflect population changes revealed by the 2001 Bangladesh census. The 2008 redistricting altered the boundaries of the constituency.

Ahead of the 2014 general election, the Election Commission expanded the boundaries of the constituency. Previously, it had excluded one union parishad of Matlab Dakshin Upazila: Narayanpur.

== Members of Parliament ==
Election	Member	Party
1986	Shamsul Haque	Jatiya Party
1988	Shamsul Haque	Jatiya Party
1991	Md. Nurul Huda	Bangladesh Nationalist Party
Feb 1996	Md. Nurul Huda	Bangladesh Nationalist Party
Jun 1996	Mofazzal Hossain Chowdhury	Awami League
2001	Md. Nurul Huda	Bangladesh Nationalist Party
2008	Mohammad Rafiqul Islam	Awami League
2014	Mofazzal Hossain Chowdhury	Awami League
2018	Nurul Amin Ruhul	Awami League
2024	Mofazzal Hossain Chowdhury	Awami League
2026	Md. Jalal Uddin	Bangladesh Nationalist Party

== Elections ==
=== Elections in the 2010s ===
Mofazzal Hossain Chowdhury was elected unopposed in the 2014 general election after opposition parties withdrew their candidates in a boycott of the election over unfair conditions for the election.

=== Elections in the 2000s ===
General Election 2008: Chandpur-2
Party	Candidate	Votes	%	±%
AL	Mohammad Rafiqul Islam	123,785	55.5	+16.9
BNP	Md. Nurul Huda	87,061	39.0	−20.7
Independent	Jalal Uddin	8,258	3.7	N/A
IAB	Mukter Hossain	2,617	1.2	N/A
Gano Front	Md. Jahirul Islam	494	0.2	N/A
LDP	Md. Billal Hossain	397	0.2	N/A
Gano Forum	Abu Bakar Siddique	385	0.2	N/A
Majority		36,754	16.5	−4.7
Turnout		222,997	82.2	+24.5
AL gain from BNP				

General Election 2001: Chandpur-2
Party	Candidate	Votes	%	±%
BNP	Md. Nurul Huda	78,205	59.7	+38.2
AL	Mofazzal Hossain Chowdhury	50,516	38.6	−28.5
Independent	Md. Aminul Haq Sarkar	1,381	1.1	N/A
Independent	Md. Jashim Uddin	333	0.3	N/A
Independent	Mohammad Shamsul Haq Sikder	217	0.2	N/A
Independent	Harun-or-Rashid	169	0.1	N/A
Independent	Md. Arshad Ali Sarkar	80	0.1	N/A
Majority		27,689	21.2	+18.1
Turnout		130,901	57.7	−14.3
BNP gain from AL				

=== Elections in the 1990s ===
General Election June 1996: Chandpur-2
Party	Candidate	Votes	%	±%
AL	Mofazzal Hossain Chowdhury	75,384	67.1	+31.2
BNP	Md. Nurul Huda	24,096	21.5	−22.4
JP(E)	A. B. Moin Uddin Hossain	10,281	9.2	−5.5
Jamaat	Abul Bashar Dewan	1,080	1.0	N/A
IOJ	Mohammad Ullah Sarkar	550	0.5	N/A
Independent	Nazir Ahmmed	325	0.3	N/A
Bangladesh Tafsili Federation (Sudir)	Ruhul Amin Sarkar	141	0.1	N/A
Independent	Quazi Hashem	135	0.1	N/A
Zaker Party	Md. Ashraf Uddin Pat	131	0.1	−1.6
Independent	Md. Jasim Uddin Sarkar	128	0.1	N/A
Independent	Md. Ala Uddin Khan	45	0.0	N/A
Majority		51,288	3.1	−4.9
Turnout		112,296	72.0	+24.7
AL gain from BNP				

General Election 1991: Chandpur-2
Party	Candidate	Votes	%	±%
BNP	Md. Nurul Huda	41,301	43.9	
AL	Mofazzal Hossain Chowdhury	33,801	35.9	
JP(E)	Shamsul Haque	13,781	14.7	
Independent	A. Matin Sarkar	1,798	1.9	
Zaker Party	Golam Mostofa	1,622	1.7	
Jatiyatabadi Gonotantrik Chashi Dal	Shah Alam	500	0.5	
FP	Hashem Kazi	477	0.5	
Bangladesh Labour Party	Sarwar Chowdhury Jasim	318	0.3	
NAP (Bhashani)	Benazir Ahmmad	248	0.3	
Janasakti Party	Zahir Hossain	204	0.2	
Majority		7,500	8.0	
Turnout		94,050	47.3	
BNP gain from JP(E)				
