= Sirajganj Sadar Upazila =

Sirajganj Sadar সিরাজগঞ্জ সদর
- Upazila of Bangladesh
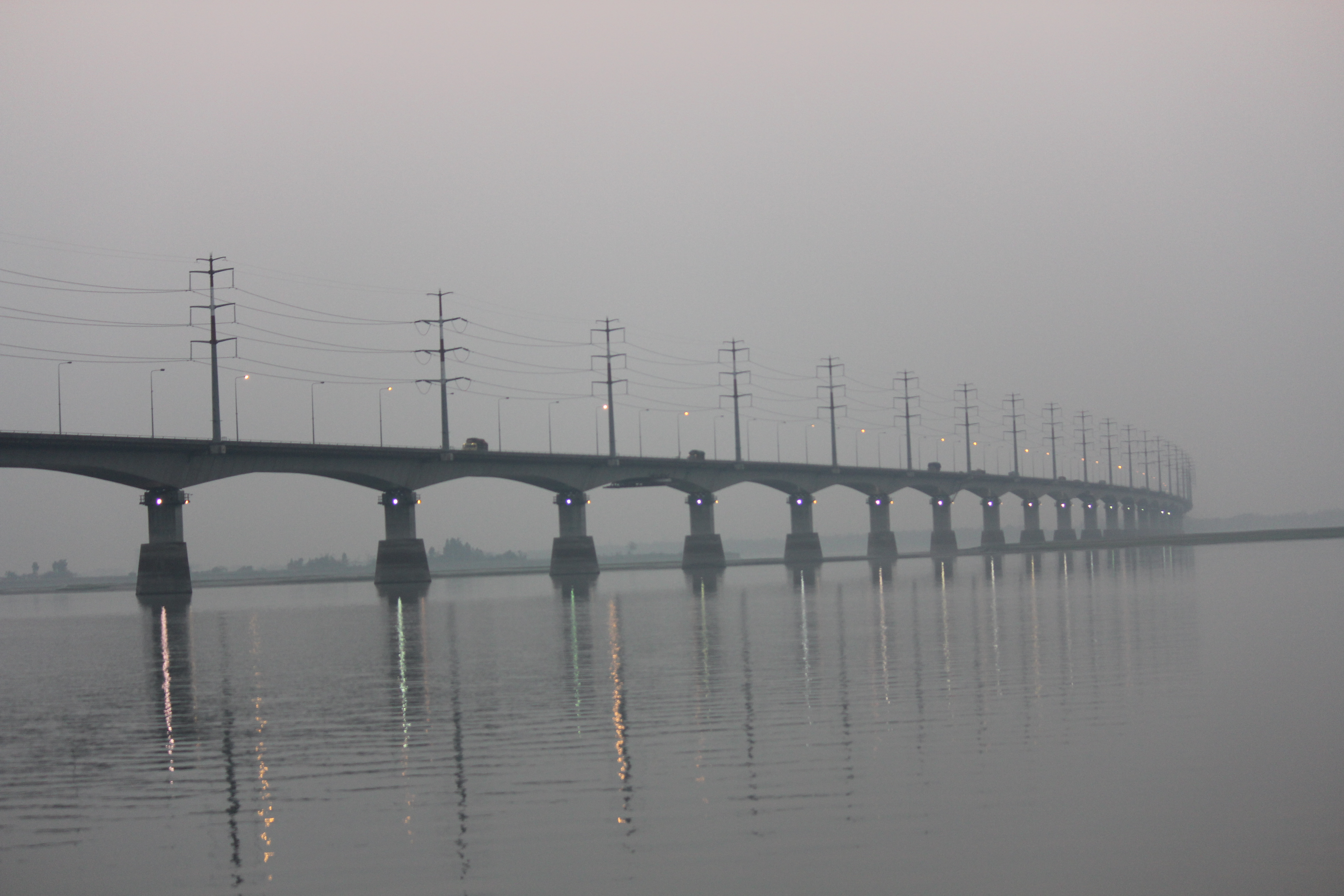
- Jamuna Bridge

- Coordinates: 24°27.5′N 89°42′E
- Country: Bangladesh
- Division: Rajshahi
- District: Sirajganj
- Headquarters: Sirajganj

Area
  - Total: 320.15 km^{2} (123.61 sq mi)

Population (2022)
  - Total: 631,928
  - Density: 1,973.8/km^{2} (5,112.2/sq mi)
- Time zone: UTC+6 (BST)
- Postal code: 6700
- Area code: 0751
- Website: sirajganj/SirajganjSadar.gif

Sirajganj Sadar Upazila mauza geocode map

Sirajganj Sadar (Bengali: সিরাজগঞ্জ সদর) is an upazila, or sub-district of Sirajganj District, it is located in Rajshahi Division, Bangladesh.

== Geography ==
Sirajganj Sadar is located at 24.4583°N 89.7000°E. It is bounded by Kazipur upazila on the north, Kamarkhanda and Belkuchi upazilas on the south, Sarishabari, Kalihati and Bhuapur upazilas on the east, Kamarkhanda, Raiganj and Dhunat upazilas on the west.

== Demographics ==
Religions in Sirajganj Sadar Upazila (2022)
Religion	Percent
Islam	96.67%
Hinduism	3.32%
Other or not stated	0.01%

According to the 2022 Bangladeshi census, Sirajganj Sadar Upazila had 155,401 households and a population of 631,928. 9.44% of the population were under 5 years of age. Sirajganj Sadar had a literacy rate (age 7 and over) of 73.63%: 75.10% for males and 72.19% for females, and a sex ratio of 98.61 males for every 100 females. 229,258 (36.28%) lived in urban areas.

According to the 2011 Census of Bangladesh, Sirajganj Sadar Upazila had 125,485 households and a population of 555,155. 130,591 (23.52%) were under 10 years of age. Sirajganj Sadar had a literacy rate (age 7 and over) of 47.96%, compared to the national average of 51.8%, and a sex ratio of 989 females per 1000 males. 167,200 (30.12%) lived in urban areas.

As of the 1991 Bangladesh census, Sirajganj Sadar has a population of 389,160. Males constitute are 51.54% of the population, and females 48.46%. This upazila's eighteen-up population is 195,911. Sirajganj Sadar has an average literacy rate of 29.8% (7+ years), and the national average of 32.4% literate.

== Administration ==
Sirajganj Sadar Thana was formed under Mymensingh district in 1772 and it was turned into an upazila in 1984.

Sirajganj Sadar Upazila is divided into Sirajganj Municipality and ten union parishads: Bagbati, Bohuli, Kaliahoripur, Khokshabari, Kawakhola, Mechhra, Ratankandi, Shialkol, Chhongachha, and Soydabad. The union parishads are subdivided into 187 mauzas and 294 villages.

Sirajganj Municipality is subdivided into 15 wards and 50 mahallas.

== Education ==
Sirajganj Sadar boasts numerous educational institutions including:

Islamia Government College (1921), Sirajganj Government College (1940), Shaheed M. Munsur Ali Medical College (2014), North Bengal Medical College (2001), Rashiddozzoha Government Women's College (1966), Bhashani Degree College (1994), Rajob Ali Memorial Science College (1999), Abdullah al Mahmud Degree College (1987), Sirajganj Govt. MATS, Sheikh Hasina Nursing College, Sirajganj Government Technical College (1966), Sirajganj Polytechnic Institute (2000), Bagbati High School (1866), Jnanadainy High School (1882), Victoria High School (1898), Char Songachha Islamia Fazil Madrasah (1919), Bhatpiary J.R.S High School (1933), Bonowari Lal Government High School (1869), Saleha Ishaque Government Girls High School (1937), Mesra High School (1948), Gotia High school (1982), Rupsha High School (1989), Suchona Kinder Garden High School-Rupsha (2003), Sabuj Kanan School and College (1980), Sirajganj Collectorate School and College (2003), Jewels Oxford International School (2002), Haji Ali Ahmad High School (1947), Jahanara High School (1969), Gowri-Urban High School (1968), S.B Railway Colony High School & College (1964), Sirajganj Police Lines School & College (2011), Shaheed Model School (2012), PDB High School (1973), Goyla Model Govt. Primary School (1845).

== Notable people ==
- Abdullah al Mahmood, lawyer and politician
- Iqbal Hassan Mahmood, minister and politician
- Rumana Mahmood, politician
- Abdullah-Al-Muti, science educator and writer

== See also ==
- Upazilas of Bangladesh
- Districts of Bangladesh
- Divisions of Bangladesh
- Administrative geography of Bangladesh
