= Mofazzal Hossain Chowdhury =

Bangladeshi politician

Mofazzal Hossain Chowdhury Maya
- মোফাজ্জল হোসেন চৌধুরী মায়া
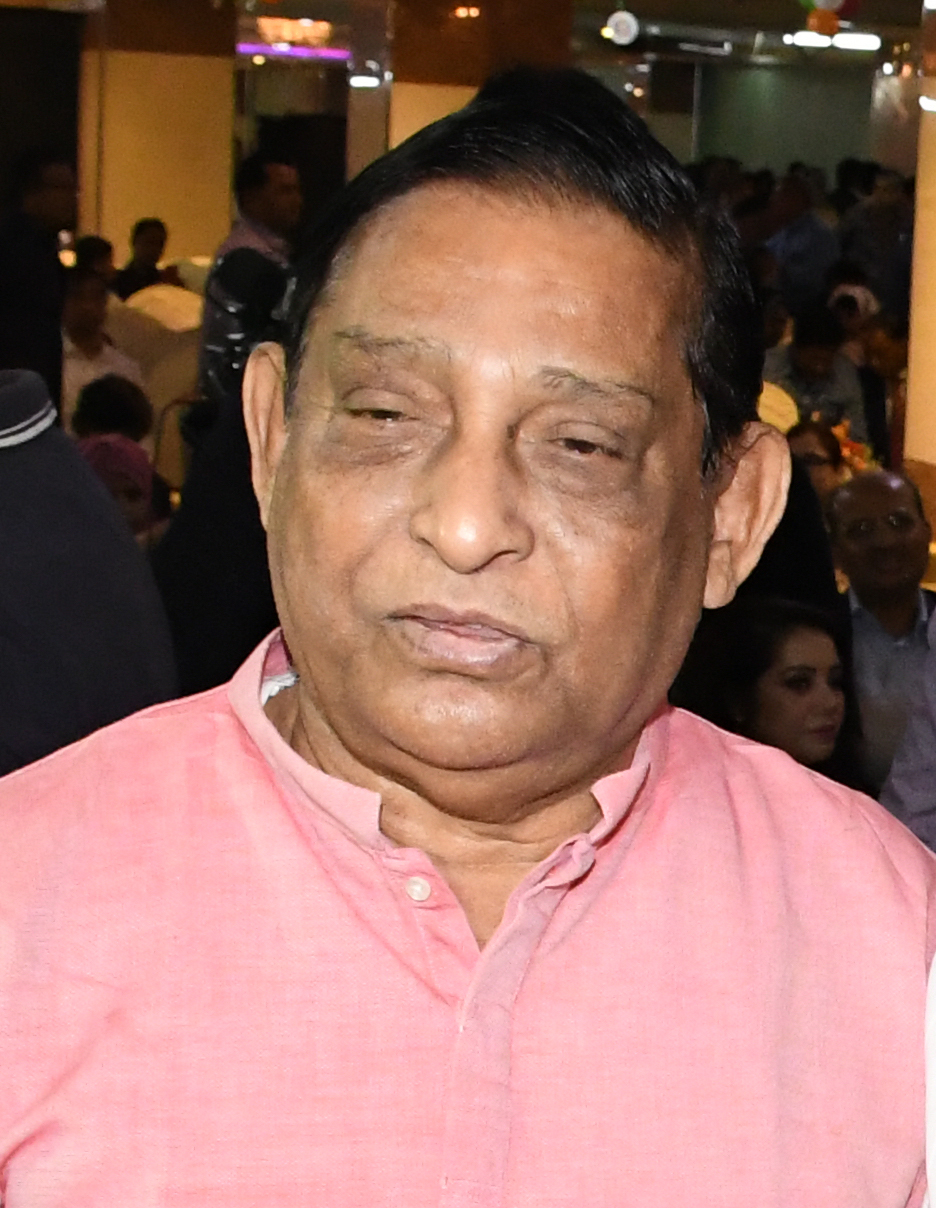

Minister of Disaster Management and Relief
- In office 14 January 2014 – 7 January 2019
- Prime Minister: Sheikh Hasina
- Preceded by: A H Mahmood Ali
- Succeeded by: Md. Enamur Rahman

Minister of State for Shipping
- In office 4 December 1998 – 15 July 2001
- Succeeded by: Mohammad Quamrul Islam

Minister of State for Local Government, Rural Development and Co-operatives
- In office 31 December 1997 – 24 December 1998
- Preceded by: Syed Abul Hossain
- Succeeded by: Md. Rahmat Ali

Member of the Bangladesh Parliament for Chandpur-2
- In office 30 January 2024 – 6 August 2024
- Preceded by: Nurul Amin Ruhul
- In office 29 January 2014 – 28 January 2019
- Preceded by: Mohammad Rafiqul Islam
- In office 14 July 1996 – 13 July 2001
- Preceded by: Md. Nurul Huda

Presidium Member of Bangladesh Awami League Central Executive Committee
- Incumbent
- Assumed office 19 November 2021

Personal details
- Born: 3 February 1948 (age 78) Chandpur, East Bengal, Pakistan
- Party: Bangladesh Awami League
- Parents: Ali Ahsan Miah (father); Musammat Akhtarunnesa (mother)
- Education: Jagannath University

Mofazzal Hossain Chowdhury Maya (born 3 February 1948) is a senior Bangladesh Awami League politician who served as a Jatiya Sangsad member representing the Chandpur-2 constituency and a minister of several ministries. On 19 November 2021 he nominated for Bangladesh Awami League Presidium member. He received the Bir Bikram, the third highest award for gallantry, for his role in the Bangladesh Liberation War. He was the general secretary for the Dhaka chapter of his party until 2016. He won the Independence Award in 2023 for his contribution to the field of independence and liberation war.

== Early life and education ==
Maya was born into a Bengali Muslim Chowdhury family in the village of Mohanpur Union in Matlab Uttar, Chandpur. His father's name was Ali Ahsan Miah and his mother was Musammat Akhtarunnesa.

Maya received his bachelor's in law and two master's degrees in political science, and Islamic history and culture.

During the Bangladesh Liberation War, Maya was a member of the Mukti Bahini under sector 2 led by Khaled Mosharraf. He was the leader of the Crack Platoon. He was awarded the third highest award for gallantry, Bir Bikram, for his contributions during the war, led by Sheikh Mujibur Rahman. Maya was a leader or participant of the platoon of students and young men under Sector No 2 that conducted guerilla attacks in Dhaka. He participated in a 9 June 1971 evening grenade attack on the Hotel Intercontinental.

== Career ==
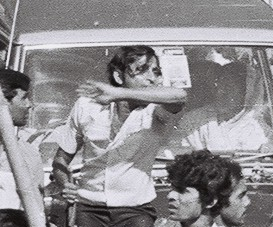
Young Mofazzal Hossain in 1987 Protest for Democracy in Dhaka. Sheikh Hasina is in the background inside the car.

Maya was held at the Dhaka Central Jail on the Jail Killing Day in 1975. He served as the general secretary of the Dhaka Awami League since 1992, when the metropolitan unit was formed, until 2016, when it was split into north and south units. From 2012 to 2021, he has served as a member of central working committee of the party. Maya has been made presidium member of the Bangladesh Awami League on 19 November 2021.

Maya served as a member of Jatiya Sangsad from the Chandpur-2 constituency of the 7th parliament (1996–2001) and the 10th parliament (2014–2018). He was selected to be the state minister of Local Governments and Rural Development and Cooperatives during 1997–1998 and state minister of Shipping during 1998–2001. He was the chair of the Bangladesh Shipping Corporation in 2003 and 2004. He served as the cabinet minister of Disaster Management and Relief during 2014–2018.

Maya was present in the event where 2004 Dhaka grenade attack occurred in a rally held by the Bangladesh Awami League.

In November 2018, Awami League President Sheikh Hasina denied Maya's nomination for the 2018 Bangladeshi general election representing the Chandpur-2 constituency.

=== Corruption charge and convictions ===
On 25 October 2007, Maya and four members of his family — his wife, two sons, and a daughter-in-law — were charged with corruption. Maya was charged with taking and not declaring money when he was the state minister for shipping. On 14 February 2008, Maya was convicted of the charges and he was sentenced to 13 years in jail, had property worth Tk 59 million confiscated, and was fined Tk 50 million. His family members were acquitted. Maya was out of the country during the trial and did not return until his party was back in power.

On 20 May 2009, he surrendered before the Dhaka court and was taken to prison, but was released after he won an appeal of the case on 27 October 2010, when the judges acquitted him of the charges. The Anti-Corruption Commission (ACC) filed an appeal of the case in 2011 before the Supreme Court, which reversed the appellate decision on 14 June 2015. Following an appeal by Maya, the charges were upheld by the supreme court of Bangladesh in April 2016. In October 2018, High Court once again acquitted Maya in that case

== Personal life ==
Maya is married to Parveen Chowdhury and has two sons and a daughter. The elder son, Sajedul Hossain Chowdhury Dipu, is involved in active politics in Chandpur as well as serving as a member of the Bangladesh Awami League Dhaka South Metropolitan committee. Dipu also previously served as member of the central executive committee of Bangladesh Awami Jubo League. In April 2008 Dipu was convicted of corruption charges and sentenced to three years in jail. The other son, Rashedul Hossain Chowdhury, is a director for the FBCCI panel of 2017–2019. The daughter, Rifat Sayeed, is married to Lieutenant Colonel (sacked) Tareque Sayeed who was convicted in the Narayanganj Seven murder case of 2014 and given death penalty on 17 January 2017 on charges of abduction, murder, concealing the bodies, conspiracy and destroying evidence.
