= Matlab (Bangladesh) =

- Location in Bangladesh
- Coordinates: 23°22′N 90°41′E
- Country: Bangladesh
- Division: Chittagong Division
- District: Chandpur District
- Time zone: UTC+6 (BST)

Matlab was an upazila of the Chandpur District of the Chittagong Division, Bangladesh. In 2000, the administrative area was subdivided into Matlab Dakshin Upazila and Matlab Uttar Upazila.

The Matlab Health and Demographic Surveillance Site (HDSS) was established in 1963 by the International Centre for Diarrhoeal Disease Research, Bangladesh, (icddr,b, former Pakistan SEATO Cholera Research Laboratory). Matlab contains the largest population under continuous PSCRL surveillance in the world. The area is representative of many rural and riverine deltas in Bangladesh, and is one of the richest and longest-running longitudinal data sources within the Global South.

In 1960, a group of American and Bangladeshi scientists journeyed across a cholera-prone sub-district of Bangladesh on a barge-turned-floating cholera hospital. This particular barge was used around Matlab to treat patients with cholera otherwise inaccessible due to their remote location. This is the story of the Matlab HDSS which would develop into the Matlab Health Research Centre - a full-fledged health care facility and one of the most important research sites in the world.

In 1966, a Health and Demographic Surveillance System (HDSS) was established in Matlab to record data regarding birth, death and migration. Initially the main purpose was to conduct cholera vaccine trials and to track the trends of public health problems of rural Bangladesh. One of the most important roles Matlab played in the field of public health was through the development of an oral rehydration solution (ORS). The ORS, at the time created from salt, molasses and water, was first trialed in 1968 at Matlab. It is now considered one of the most important medical advances of the 20th century and estimated to have saved around 50 million lives globally.

== Geography ==
Matlab is a former thana of the Chandpur district of Bangladesh, situated 55 km southeast of Dhaka. its total area in regards to the HDSS is 184 km^{2}. Three seasons are typical: monsoon, cool-dry, and hot-dry, and the climate is sub-tropical. It is subject to annual flooding due to its position within low-lying flatlands. Average annual rainfall is approximately 2159mm, concentrated mainly during monsoon season (June to September).

== Inception, structure and procedure ==
During its inception, 132 villages were included and 101 villages were added in 1968. Traditional Birth Attendants (dais, elderly illiterate women mostly) used to work to detect and record data of the vital events through weekly household visit. Health Assistants (HA) along with the Dais visited households every six weeks with standard registration forms. In 1977, major modification of field structure and programme activities were made, leading to the exclusion of 84 villages and the retention of 149 villages. The Family Planning and Health Services Project was then launched in 70 villages with the remaining 79 villages not included intentionally to serve as a comparison area. The Dais of both treated areas and comparison areas were eventually replaced by female Community Health Workers (CHW). In 1993, due to river erosion, 7 villages within the comparison area disappeared, reducing the project to 142 villages. However, the majority of villagers resettled within nearby villages still participating in the HDSS.

A typical village in Bangladesh consists of several baris – groups of houses centered around courtyards – which function as economic and social units. The HDSS system covers all houses within these areas. Data is collected from individuals who are regular residents (either permanent or those who have resided continuously within these areas for at least 6 months). Birth, death, and migrations have been recorded since 1966, and the recording of marriages and divorces began in 1975. Recording of split households and changes in family type began after the 1993 census.

Data is collected within treatment and comparison areas through the Record Keeping System (RKS). The health data currently covers married women of reproductive age (data includes reproductive status, contraception, tetanus, etc.) and children under 5 (immunization, diarrhea, acute lower respiratory infection, breastfeeding, etc.). The Geographical Information System (GIS) was introduced in 1993. In HDSS's administrative term, three projects are running in the area: DSS, RKS and GIS. The system also collects socioeconomic data.

== Field procedures ==
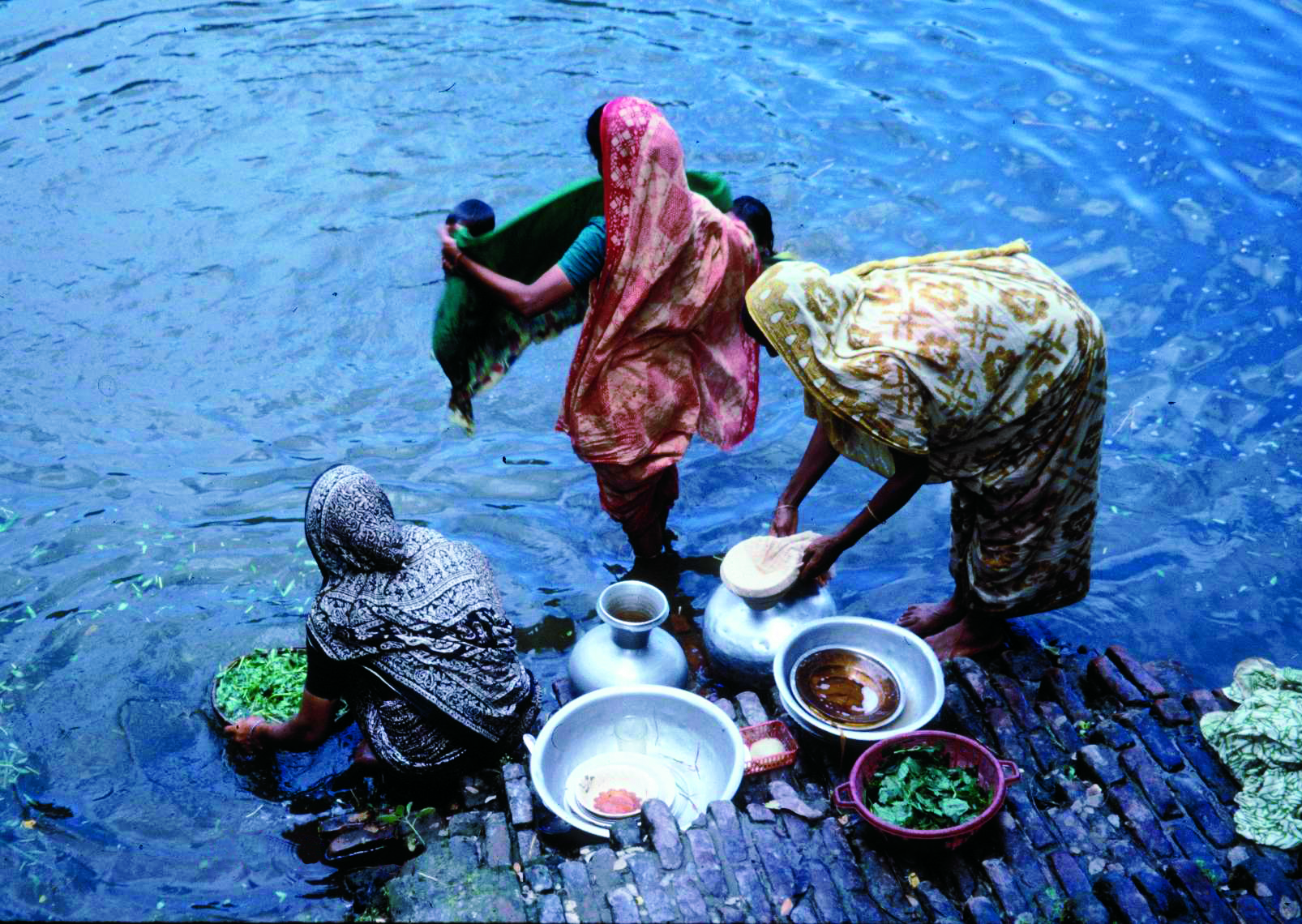
Washing vegetables and filtering water through cloth in Matlab

a) Initial census and regular update rounds - CHWs collect data through monthly household visits. They also provide health services to mothers and children in treatment areas, while in comparison areas they simply advise residents to visit government health facilities.

b) Continuous surveys - CHWs enquire about demographic events which have occurred since their last visit. Special forms and record keeping books (RKBs) are used to keep health data.

c) Supervision and quality control - field research assistants supervise CHWs, while overall field activities are supervised by field managers.

== Priority research area ==
Fertility, reproductive health, maternal and child health, child morbidity and causes of death, health equity, and climate change.

== Impact of Matlab on public health ==
The development of oral rehydration saline.

Family planning: the introduction of CHWs in 1970 greatly increased contraceptive use and reduced fertility. These methods were later adopted internationally.

Immunization: Matlab showed that 63% of childhood deaths were due to vaccine-preventable disease and could be prevented by effective immunization campaigns.

Child health and family planning: child mortality has been reduced by about 75% within the last 25 years due to the combined efforts of childhood health and family planning programmes.
