= Nurul Amin Ruhul =

Bangladeshi politician (born 1959)

- নুরুল আমিন রুহুল
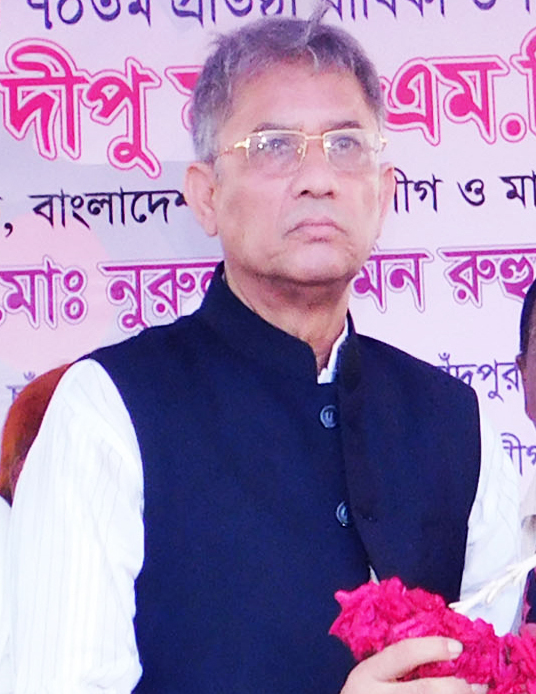
- Advocate Nurul Amin Ruhul, Member of parliament In Bangladesh (2019)

Member of the Bangladesh Parliament for Chandpur-2
- Incumbent
- Assumed office 30 January 2018
- Preceded by: Mofazzal Hossain Chowdhury

Personal details
- Born: 14 October 1959 (age 66) Chandpur District
- Party: Bangladesh Awami League
- Education: Dhaka University

Nurul Amin Ruhul, also known as Ruhul Bhai (born 14 October 1959), is a Bangladeshi politician. He is a former member of parliament from Chandpur-2 constituency in the Bangladesh Parliament.

== Political life ==
Nurul Amin was elected a member of parliament from Chandpur-2 (Matlab North and South) constituency by defeating BNP's Jalal Uddin in the nomination of Bangladesh Awami League in the eleventh parliamentary elections in 2018. He was elected as the member of the Awami League's Dhaka University. Prior to this, he was the president of Bangladesh Chhatra League, publicity secretary and the chairman of the undivided Dhaka Metropolitan Chhatra League.
