= University of South Asia, Bangladesh =

Private university in Savar, Dhaka

- ইউনিভার্সিটি অব সাউথ এশিয়া
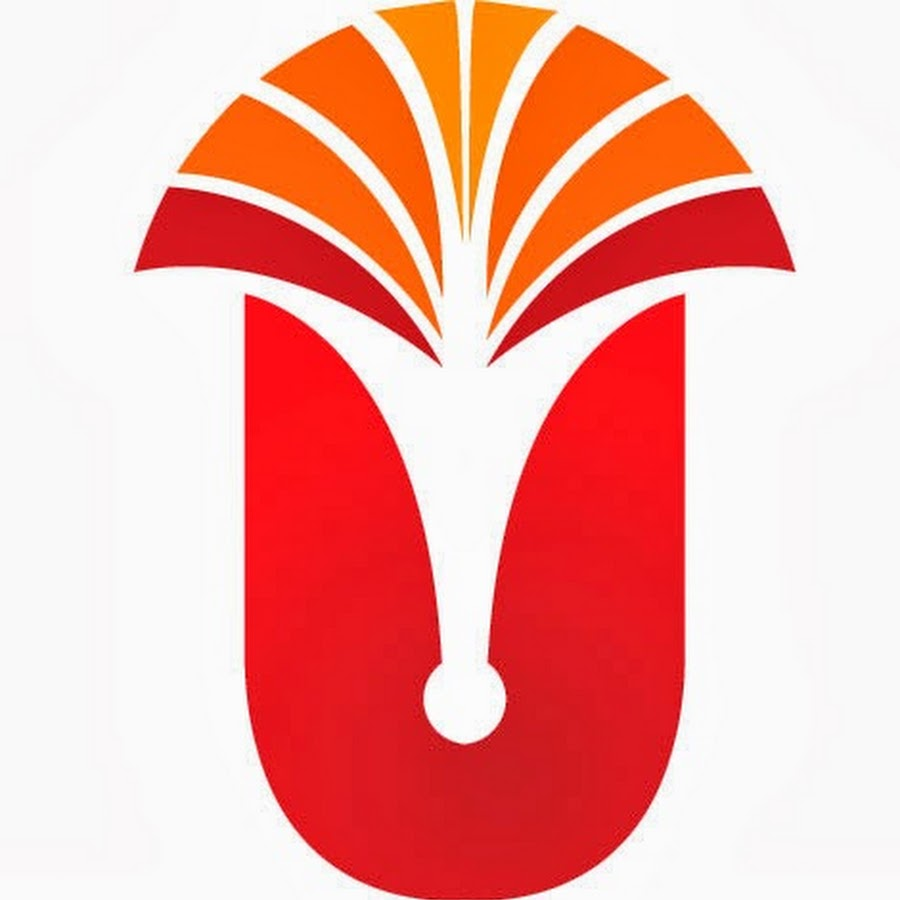
- Type: Private research university
- Established: 2003
- Chancellor: President Mohammed Shahabuddin
- Vice-Chancellor: M. A. Wadud Mondal
- Academic staff: 108
- Students: 2,900
- Location: Amin Bazar, Savar Upazila, Dhaka District, Bangladesh; 23.793252°N 90.316189°E
- Language: English
- Website: www.southasiauni.ac.bd

University of South Asia (Bengali: ইউনিভার্সিটি অব সাউথ এশিয়া) or UNISA is a private university in the Amin Bazar, Savar, Dhaka, Bangladesh. Its curriculum has been approved by the University Grants Commission.

== History ==
The university was founded in 2003.

In July 2010, students protesting against value-added tax on tuition blockaded the Dhaka-Mymensingh highway near the university's temporary campus in the Banai neighborhood of Dhaka. Unable to negotiate an end to the conflict, police baton charged the protesters and fired tear gas to clear the road. Students threw brick bats at the police and vandalised vehicles.

A University Grants Commission (UGC) team made a surprise inspection of the university in August 2016. They did not find the vice-chancellor, pro-vice-chancellor, or treasurer on campus. The board of trustees was not formed in accordance with the rules, there was a lack of senior teachers, research was not being performed, and needy students and children of freedom fighters were not being admitted in line with their quotas. In November, the UGC recommended that the Education Ministry cancel the university's temporary approval.

The Private Universities Act 2010 allows at most one-third of the instructors at a university to be part-time. In 2017, more than two-thirds were part time. As of August 2022, the university had only one full professor, the remaining instructors being assistant professors or lecturers.

According to the UGC, the university carried out no research in 2017 or 2018.

By 2018, the university had 4 faculties with a total of 17 departments, and enrollment was 2900. Approximately 70% of students were pursuing degrees in engineering and technology, 15% in business, and 8% in science. About one tenth of the students were female.

It moved to its permanent campus in Savar Upazila in 2022.

== Academics ==
The university has four schools:

=== University of South Asia Business School ===
- Bachelor of Business Administration (BBA)
- Master of Business Administration (MBA)
- Executive Master of Business Administration (EMBA)
- Master of Bank Management (MBM)

=== University of South Asia School of Engineering ===
- Bachelor of Computer Science & Engineering (BCSE)
- Bachelor of Computer Science & Information Technology (BCSIT)
- Bachelor of Textile Engineering (BTE)
- Master of Computer Application (MCA)
- Master of Computer Science (MCS)

=== University of South Asia School of Humanities ===
- Bachelor of Arts in English Literature & Culture (BAE)

=== University of South Asia School of Public Health and Life Science ===
- Bachelor of Environmental Science (BES)
- Master of Nutrition & Food Science (MNFS)
- Master of Public Health (MPH)
- Master of Public Health of Ophthalmology
- Diploma of Optometry & Low Vision (DOLV) and Diploma of Nutrition &Food Science (DNFS)

== List of vice-chancellors ==
- Vacant (January 2016 – June 2017)
- M. A. Wadud Mondal (June 2017–present)
