= Deputy Prime Minister of Bangladesh =

Deputy Head of Government of Bangladesh from 1979 to 1990

Deputy Prime Minister of the People's Republic of Bangladesh
- গণপ্রজাতন্ত্রী বাংলাদেশের উপ-প্রধানমন্ত্রী
- National emblem of Bangladesh

- Flag of Bangladesh
- Government of Bangladesh; Cabinet Division
- Style: Mr. Deputy Prime Minister (informal); The Honorable (formal); His Excellency (diplomatic)
- Status: Abolished
- Abbreviation: DPM
- Member of: Cabinet; Parliament
- Seat: Bangladesh Secretariat, Dhaka
- Appointer: President on the advice of the Prime Minister
- Term length: At the pleasure of the Prime Minister
- Formation: 17 April 1979; 47 years ago
- First holder: Moudud Ahmed
- Final holder: Shah Moazzem Hossain
- Abolished: 6 December 1990 (Note: Through the 13th amendment to the Constitution of Bangladesh in 1996)

The deputy prime minister of Bangladesh (Bengali: বাংলাদেশের উপ-প্রধানমন্ত্রী, romanized: Bangladesher Upo-Prodhanmontri), officially Deputy Prime Minister of the People's Republic of Bangladesh (Bengali: গণপ্রজাতন্ত্রী বাংলাদেশের উপ-প্রধানমন্ত্রী, romanized: Gonoprojatantri Bangladesh Shorkarer Upo-Prodhanmontri) was the second chief executive of the Government of the People's Republic of Bangladesh and the second highest ranking Parliamentary Leader of the Jatiya Sangsad. A Deputy Prime Minister might, in the absence of the Prime Minister, carry out the functions of the Cabinet as well as the responsibilities of any other independent ministry.

== List ==
Political Party

- Bangladesh Nationalist Party
- Jatiya Party (Ershad)
- Independent

No.	Portrait	Name (Birth–Death)	Term of office			Political Party	Prime Minister	President	Ref.
No.	Portrait	Name (Birth–Death)	Term start	Term end	Time in office	Political Party	Prime Minister	President	Ref.
1		Moudud Ahmed (1940-2021)	15 April 1979	2 January 1980	262 days	Bangladesh Nationalist Party	Shah Azizur Rahman	Ziaur Rahman	
2		A. Q. M. Badruddoza Chowdhury (1930-2024) Senior Deputy Prime Minister	15 April 1979	23 August 1979	130 days	Bangladesh Nationalist Party	Shah Azizur Rahman	Ziaur Rahman	
3		Jamal Uddin Ahmad (1932-2015)	23 August 1979	11 February 1982	2 years, 172 days	Bangladesh Nationalist Party	Shah Azizur Rahman	Ziaur Rahman (21 April 1977 - 30 May 1981) Abdus Sattar (30 May 1981 - 24 March 1982)	
4		S. A. Bari (1927-1987)	23 August 1979	27 November 1981	2 years, 96 days	Bangladesh Nationalist Party	Shah Azizur Rahman	Ziaur Rahman (21 April 1977 - 30 May 1981) Abdus Sattar (30 May 1981 - 24 March 1982)	
(1)		Moudud Ahmed (1940-2021)	9 July 1986	27 March 1988	1 year, 262 days	Jatya Party	Mizanur Rahman Chowdhury	Hussain Muhammad Ershad	
5		Kazi Zafar Ahmed (1939-2015)	9 July 1986	10 August 1987	3 years, 34 days	Jatya Party	Mizanur Rahman Chowdhury	Hussain Muhammad Ershad	
(5)		Kazi Zafar Ahmed (1939-2015)	27 March 1988	12 August 1989	3 years, 34 days	Jatya Party	Moudud Ahmed	Hussain Muhammad Ershad	
6		M.A. Matin (1932-2012)	9 July 1986	13 August 1989	3 years, 35 days	Jatya Party	Mizanur Rahman Chowdhury (9 July 1986 - 27 March 1988) Moudud Ahmed (27 March 1988 - 12 August 1989) Kazi Zafar Ahmed (12 August 1989 - 6 December 1990)	Hussain Muhammad Ershad	
7		Shah Moazzem Hossain (1939-2022)	20 November 1987	6 December 1990	3 years, 16 days	Jatya Party	Mizanur Rahman Chowdhury (9 July 1986 - 27 March 1988) Moudud Ahmed (27 March 1988 - 12 August 1989) Kazi Zafar Ahmed (12 August 1989 - 6 December 1990)	Hussain Muhammad Ershad	
Post abolished

=== Deputy Prime Minister (1979-1980) ===
#	Portrait	Name (Birth–Death)	Term start	Term end
1		Moudud Ahmed 1940-2021	15 April 1979	2 January 1980
Post abolished

=== Senior Deputy Prime Minister (1979-1981) ===
#	Portrait	Name (Birth–Death)	Term start	Term end
2		A. Q. M. Badruddoza Chowdhury 1930-2024	15 April 1979	23 August 1979
3		Jamal Uddin Ahmad; 1929-2015	23 August 1979	11 February 1982
4		S. A. Bari; 1927-1987	23 August 1979	27 November 1981
Post abolished

=== Senior Deputy Prime Minister (1986-1990) ===
#	Portrait	Name (Birth–Death)	Term start	Term end
(1)		Moudud Ahmed; 1940-2021	9 July 1986	27 March 1988
5		Kazi Zafar Ahmed 1939-2015	9 July 1986	10 August 1987
(5)		Kazi Zafar Ahmed 1939-2015	27 March 1988	12 August 1989
6		M.A. Matin 1932-2012	9 July 1986	13 August 1989
7		Shah Moazzem Hossain; 1939-2022	20 November 1987	6 December 1990
Post abolished

== See also ==
- Prime Minister of Bangladesh
- Government of Bangladesh
