= Matlab Uttar Upazila =

Matlab Uttar মতলব উত্তর
- Upazila
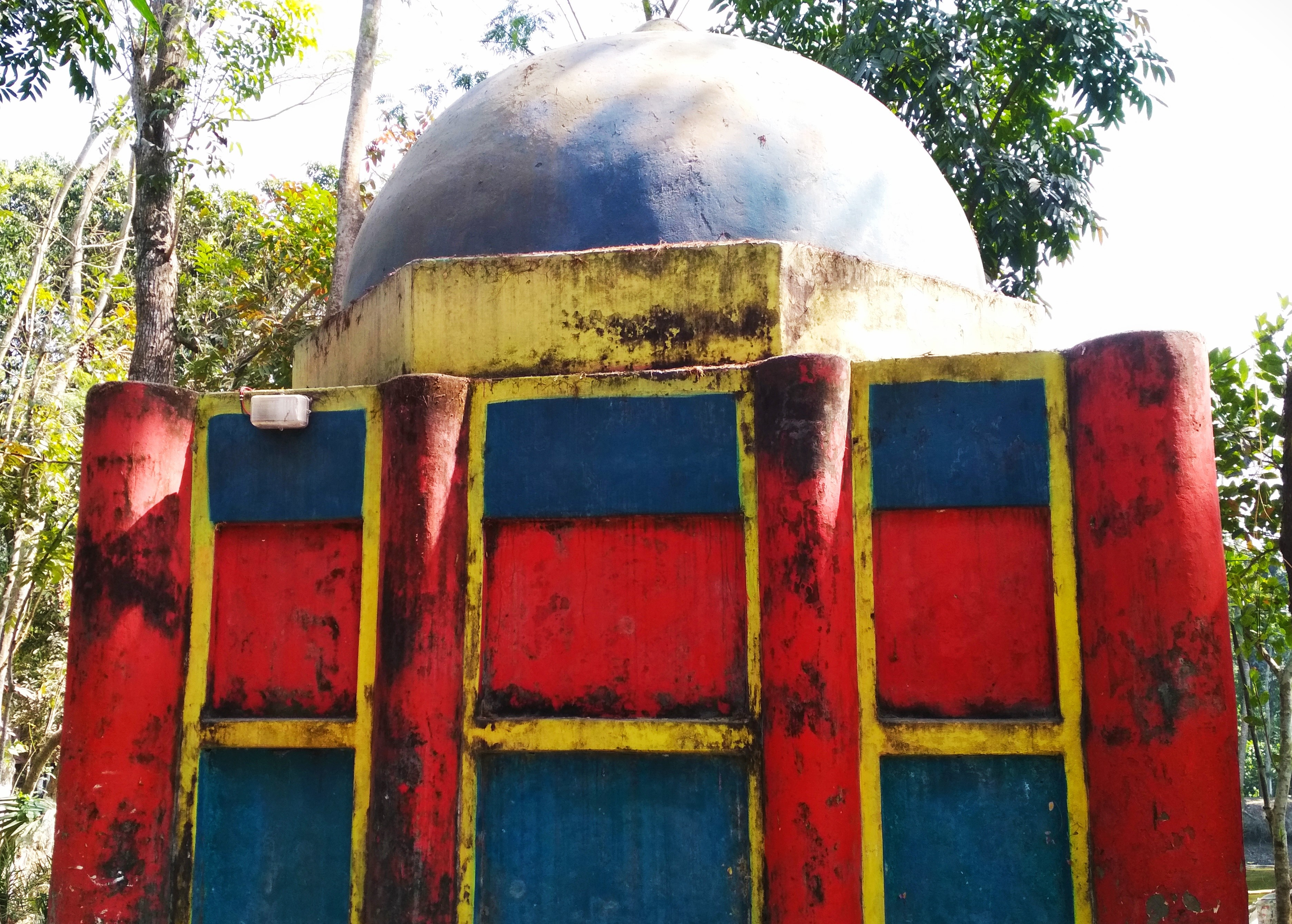
- Choto Haludiya One Dome Mosque, Uttar Matlab

- Coordinates: 23°26′N 90°38′E
- Country: Bangladesh
- Division: Chittagong
- District: Chandpur

Government
  - MP (Chandpur-2): Nurul Amin Ruhul
  - Upazila Chairman: Muhammad Abdul Quddus.

Area
  - Total: 260.29 km^{2} (100.50 sq mi)

Population (2022)
  - Total: 295,821
  - Density: 1,136.5/km^{2} (2,943.5/sq mi)
- Time zone: UTC+6 (BST)
- Postal code: 3643 (Changerchar)
- Postal code: 3642 (Kalipura Bazar)
- Area code: 08426
- Website: matlabnorth.chandpur.gov.bd

Matlab Uttar Upazila mauza geocode map

Matlab Uttar (Bengali: মতলব উত্তর, romanized: Motlob Uttor, lit. 'Matlab North') is an upazila of Chandpur District in Chattogram Division, Bangladesh. The former Matlab Upazila was bifurcated in 2000, creating Matlab Dakshin and Matlab Uttar upazilas.

== History ==
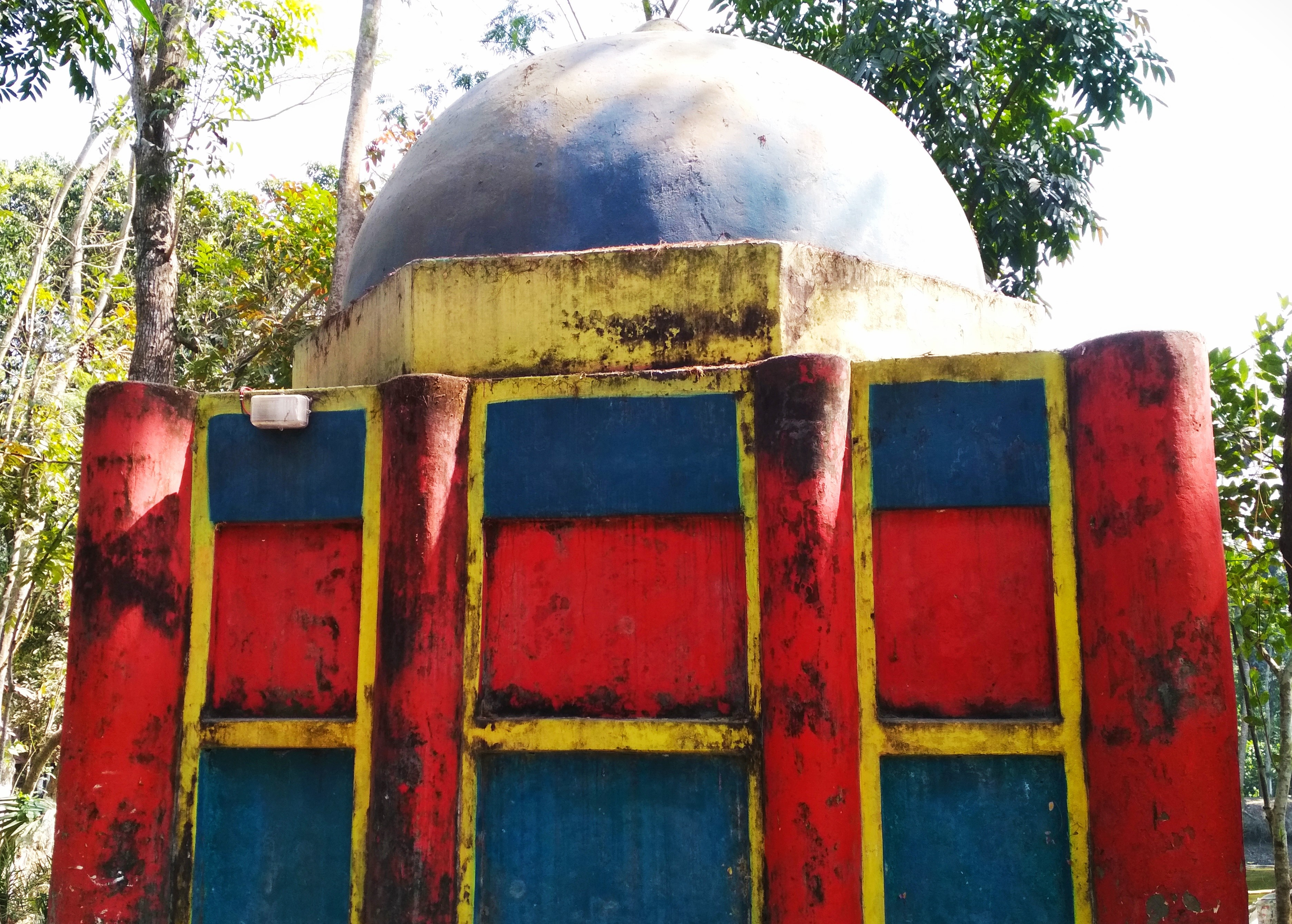
An old mosque in Sarkar Bari, Chhoto Holudiya village, Farazikandi Union.

During the Mughal period, when the Lalar Hat Bazaar, located on the banks of the Dhanagoda River, a tributary of the Gumti, at the northern end of the present villages of Babu Para and Pail Para, was destroyed by river erosion, a market called Bairagir Hat at the northern end of the Kaladi village was founded by the Jamadar of Matlab. Jealous of this, the Zamindar of Faridpur increased his zamindari and established another market in his name in the western part south of the Bairagir Hat. After some time, both the markets became very competitive and Jamadar's haat bazaar became popularly known as Matlab rather than Bairagir Hat. The name Matlab was gazetted on 9 August 1918. Gazette No. 236. In 1900, the government divided the Chandpur circle and created the Matlab circle. As a result, the progress of police station with 22 unions started.

During the Bangladesh War of Independence in 1971, the area was under the control of Bengali pro-independence fighters. Whenever the Pakistan Army tried to enter the area, skirmishes would take place. A hospital was established for the wounded freedom fighters in the village of Nishchintapur. There were also mass graves in the village of Harina.

On 30 April 2000, Matlab Uttar Upazila, an archipelago surrounded by the Meghna-Dhanagoda river, started its journey as an independent upazila with 1 municipality and 13 unions (later 1 increase). Later on 5 September of the same year Matlab North started functioning as a newly created upazila. As the adjoining Matlab upazila is on the north side, this upazila was named Matlab Uttar.

== Geography ==
Matlab is located at 23.4500°N 90.63°E. It has a total land area of 260.29 km^{2}.

== Demographics ==
Religions in Matlab Uttar Upazila (2022)
Religion	Percent
Islam	93.89%
Hinduism	6.11%

According to the 2022 Bangladeshi census, Matlab Uttar Upazila had 74,514 households and a population of 295,821. 9.45% of the population were under 5 years of age. Matlab Uttar had a literacy rate (age 7 and over) of 76.97%: 78.56% for males and 75.64% for females, and a sex ratio of 85.65 males for every 100 females. 50,434 (17.05%) lived in urban areas.

According to the 2011 Census of Bangladesh, Matlab Uttar Upazila had 63,784 households and a population of 292,057. 64,180 (21.98%) were under 10 years of age. Matlab Uttar had a literacy rate (age 7 and over) of 54.40%, compared to the national average of 51.8%, and a sex ratio of 1075 females per 1000 males. 36,691 (12.56%) lived in urban areas.

== Administration ==
Matlab Uttar Upazila is divided into Chengar Char Municipality and 14 union parishads: Baganbari, Durgapur, Eklaspur, Faraji Kandi, Gazra, Islamabad, Jahirabad, Kalakanda, Mohanpur, Paschim Fatehpur, Purba Fatehpur, Sadullapur, Satnal, and Sultanabad. The union parishads are subdivided into 127 mauzas and 251 villages.

Chengar Char Municipality is subdivided into 9 wards and 41 mahallas.

== Research ==
Matlab, including both Matlab Dakshin and Matlab Uttar Upazilas, is also the primary rural field site for the International Centre for Diarrhoeal Disease Research, and the world's longest running health project.

== Notable people ==
- Rafiqul Islam - National Professor, president of Bangla Academy, chairman of Nazrul Institute and 1st vice-chancellor of Jashore University of Science and Technology
- Shamsul Alam, economist and state minister of planning
- Aziz Ahmed, 16th Chief of Bangladesh Army Staff
- Mofazzal Hossain Chowdhury - Awami League, politician and former minister
- Md. Nurul Huda, Bangladesh Nationalist Party politician and former minister
- Nawab Ali, first Bengali principal of Dhaka Medical College and Hospital
- Wahiduddin Ahmed, 3rd vice chancellor of BUET, adviser to interim government led by the then president Justice Shahabuddin Ahmed in December 1990
- Golam Mostafa Mia, ex-chairman
- Monowarul Islam, ex-chairman
- Golam Rabbani Bablu
- Rabiul Awal, Lyricist & Author

== See also ==
- Upazilas of Bangladesh
- Districts of Bangladesh
- Divisions of Bangladesh
- Administrative geography of Bangladesh
