= Rumana Mahmood =

Bangladeshi politician

- রুমানা মাহমুদ

Member of the Bangladesh Parliament for Sirajganj-2
- In office 25 January 2009 – 24 January 2014
- Preceded by: Iqbal Hassan Mahmood
- Succeeded by: Md. Habibe Millat

Personal details
- Born: 31 July 1951 (age 75) Natore, East Bengal, Pakistan
- Party: Bangladesh Nationalist Party
- Spouse: Iqbal Hassan Mahmood
- Relatives: Abdullah al Mahmood (father-in-law)

Rumana Mahmood (born 30 July 1951) is a Bangladesh Nationalist Party politician and a former member of parliament from Sirajganj-2.

== Early life and education ==
Begum Rumana was born on 30 July 1951 in Natore. She holds a Bachelor of Science degree. She later married Iqbal Hassan Mahmood and moved to Sirajganj.

== Career ==
Mahmood was elected to parliament in 2008 from Sirajganj-2 as a Bangladesh Nationalist Party candidate. She was a member of the parliamentary standing committee on the Ministry of Commerce.
