= Kazipur Upazila =

Kazipur কাজীপুর
- Upazila of Bangladesh
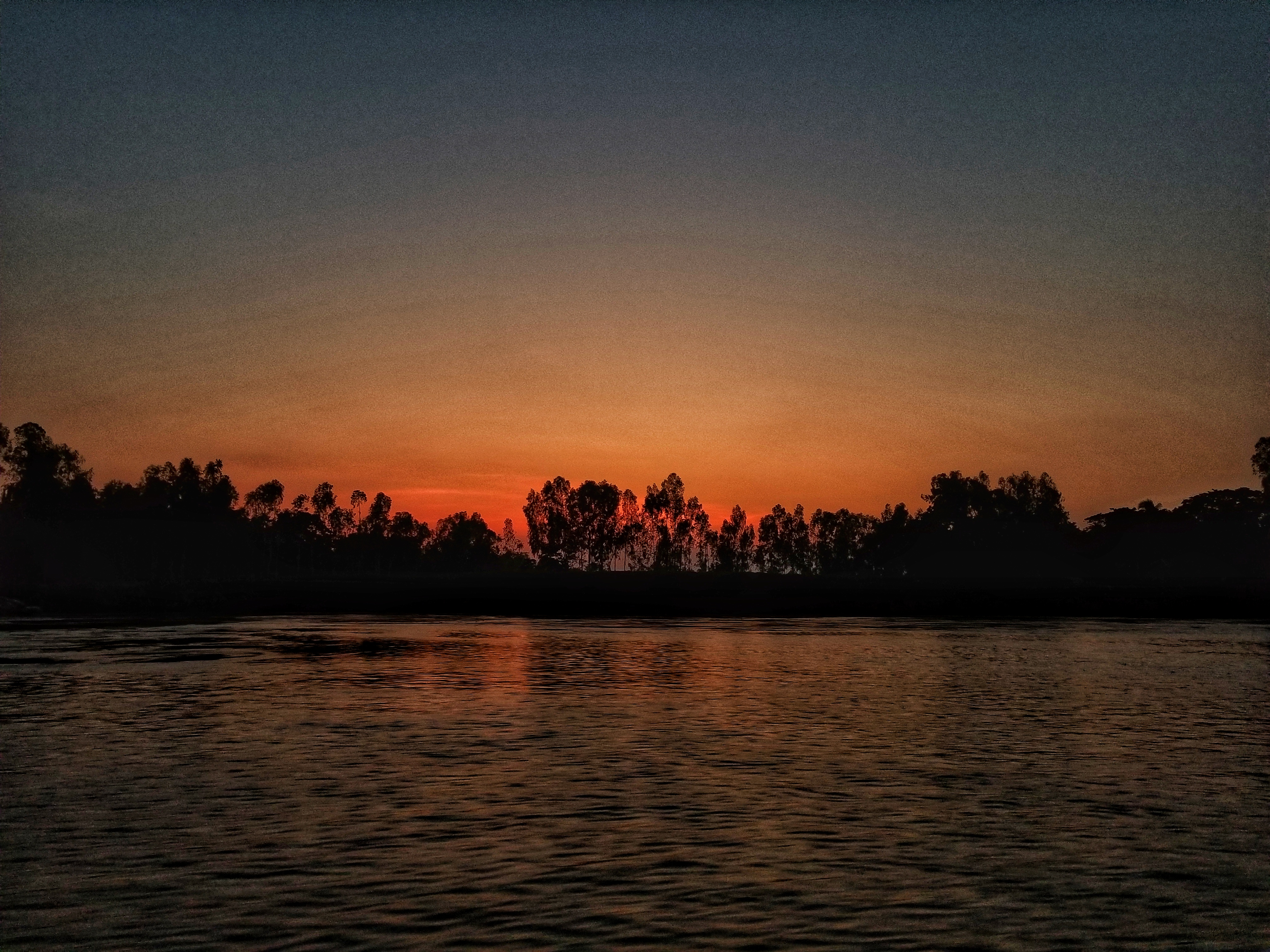
- Jamuna River in Kazipur Upazila

- Location of Sirajganj District in Bangladesh
- Coordinates: 24°38.5′N 89°39′E
- Country: Bangladesh
- Division: Rajshahi
- District: Sirajganj

Government

Area
  - Total: 328.79 km^{2} (126.95 sq mi)

Population (2022)
  - Total: 281,442
  - Density: 855.99/km^{2} (2,217.0/sq mi)
- Time zone: UTC+6 (BST)
- Postal code: 6710
- Area code: 07525
- Website: kazipur.sirajganj.gov.bd

Kazipur Upazila mauza geocode map

Kazipur (Bengali: কাজীপুর) is an upazila, or sub-district of Sirajganj District, located in Rajshahi Division, Bangladesh.

== Geography ==
Kazipur is located at 24.6417°N 89.6500°E. The total area of the upazila is 328.79 km^{2} (127 sq mi). The main river is the Jamuna, which branches and rejoins several times. The Ichamati crosses the western edge of the upazila. It is bounded by Dhunat, Sariakandi and Sarishabari upazilas on the north, Sirajganj sadar upazila on the south, Sarishabari upazila and the Jamuna river on the east, Dhunat upazila on the west.

== Demographics ==
Religions in Kazipur Upazila (2022)
Religion	Percent
Islam	97.56%
Hinduism	2.44%
Other or not stated	0.00%

According to the 2022 Bangladeshi census, Kazipur Upazila had 74,843 households and a population of 281,442. 9.64% of the population were under 5 years of age. Kazipur had a literacy rate (age 7 and over) of 63.95%: 67.20% for males and 60.93% for females, and a sex ratio of 94.40 males for every 100 females. 62,555 (22.23%) lived in urban areas.

According to the 2011 Census of Bangladesh, Kazipur Upazila had 69,664 households and a population of 274,679. 67,663 (24.63%) were under 10 years of age. Kazipur had a literacy rate (age 7 and over) of 37.50%, compared to the national average of 51.8%, and a sex ratio of 1035 females per 1000 males. 16,540 (6.02%) lived in urban areas.

Par the 2001 Bangladesh census, Kazipur has a population of 2,66,950; male constituted 136056 of the population, female 130894.

As of the 1991 Bangladesh census, Kazipur had a population of 244,804. 50.39% male and 49.61% female. The adult population is 120,257. Kazipur had an average literacy rate of 30.5% (7+ years), against the national average of 42.4% literate.

== Administration ==
Kazipur Thana, now an upazila, was formed in 1920.

Kazipur Upazila is divided into Kazipur Municipality and 12 union parishads: Chargirish, Chalitadanga, Gandail, Kazipur, Khasrajbari, Maijbari, Mansur Nagar, Natuarpara, Nishchintapur, Sonamukhi, Subhagacha, and Tekani. The union parishads are subdivided into 108 mauzas and 172 villages.

Kazipur Municipality is subdivided into 9 wards and 11 mahallas.

== Education ==
Educational institutions: College: 1. Govt. Bangabandhu Degree College (1998), 2.Kazipur Government Mansur Ali College, R.I.M Degree College-Tenglahata (1969), Meghai UUI Multilateral High School (1919), Subgacha Tenglahata Rafatullah Multilateral High School (1944) Gandhail High School (1946), Rani Dinamoni High School (1957), Kazipur A.M.u Government Girls' High School, Tarakandi High School (1937). Shaheed M Monsur Ali Institute Of Health Technology-IHT, Kazipur, Sirajganj was founded in 2015. Begum Amina Mansur Textile Engineering Institute, Kazipur, Sirajganj project is ongoing and is expected to start enrolment anytime soon.

== Notable people ==
- Captain Muhammad Mansur Ali, the national leader of Bangladesh
- Mohammed Nasim MP, former Home Minister and Health Minister
