= Takkar =

Takkar may refer to:

== Media ==
- Takkar (1980 film), an Indian Hindi-language action film
- Takkar (1995 film), an Indian Hindi-language romance crime film
- Takkar (2008 film), an Indian Bengali-language film
- Takkar (2023 film), an Indian Tamil-language film

== Other ==
- Sardar Ali Takkar, a Pakistani Pashto singer
- Takkar (Mardan District), a village and union council of Mardan District, Pakistan
  - Takkar massacre, 1930 massacre by the British Indian Army
