= Salanga massacre =

1922 massacre in British India

- Part of Indian independence movement
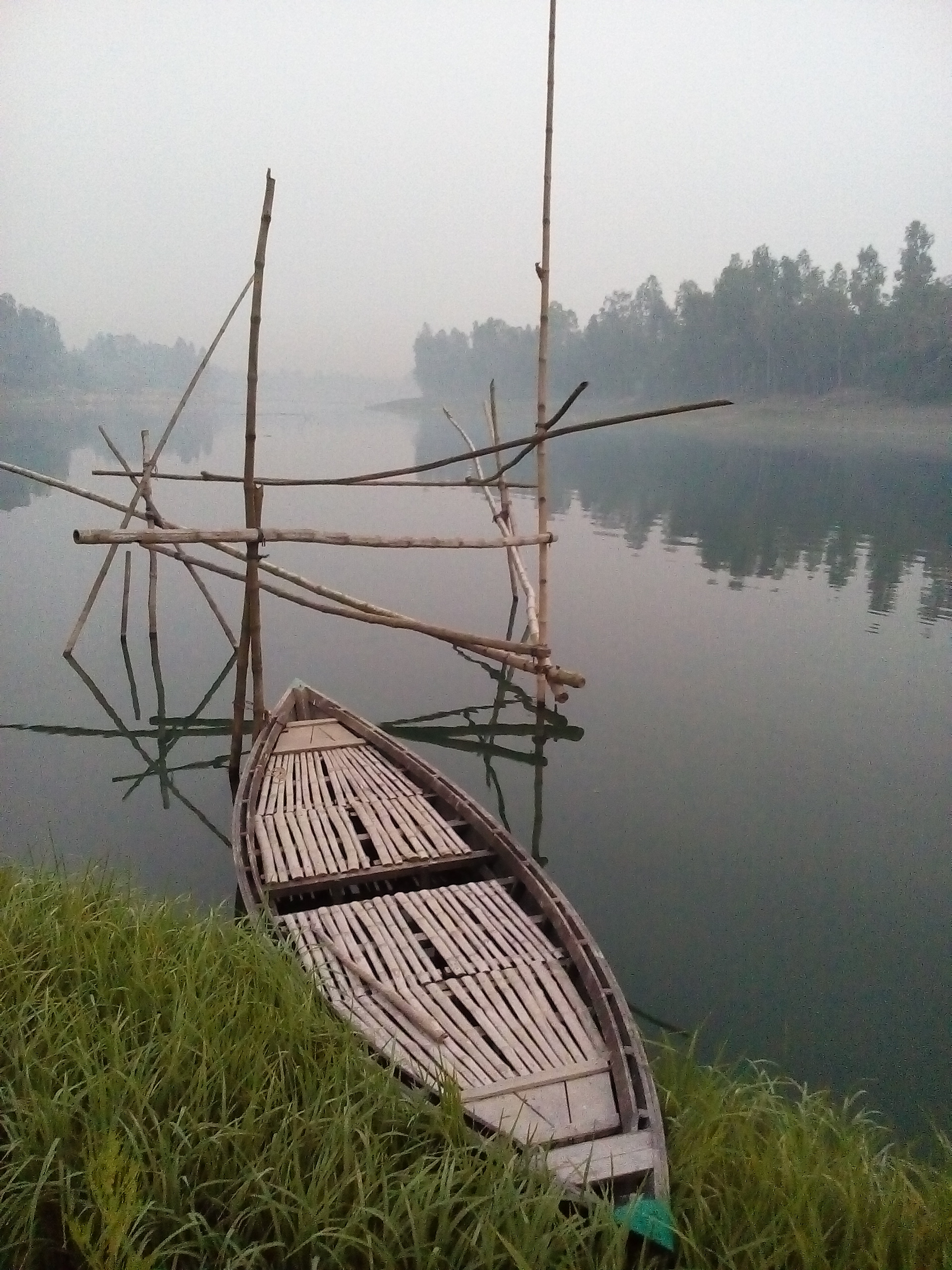
- a riverbank in Raiganj, Sirajganj in 2020
- Date: 27 January 1922
- Location: Salanga, Ullapara Upazila, British India (now Sirajganj District, Bangladesh)
- Caused by: attempted arrest of Abdur Rashid Tarkabagish; Unrest in British India

Parties
Indian Imperial Police	Protestors

Casualties
- Death: 1,500 to 4,500 people

Several hundred protesters were killed in the Salanga massacre (Bengali: সলঙ্গা গণহত্যা; [ʃɔlɔŋɡa ɡɔɳɔɦot̪ːa]), on 27 January 1922, when fired on by the Indian Imperial Police at the Salanga bazaar in Ullapara Upazila in what was then the Bengal province of British India. The area is now within the Sirajganj District of Bangladesh.

== Background ==
Abdur Rashid Tarkabagish mentioned that the tide of violent movement broke out across the country. Volunteers were campaigning in groups to boycott foreign clothes and other goods in every city, village, market. The colonial government tightened its policy of repression.

== The massacre ==
Following an intelligence report that revolutionaries, led by Tarkabagish, were regrouping. the then superintendent of police (SP) in Pabna, led by the district administration, went to Salanga market and arrested Abdur Rashid Tarkabagish from the Congress office and took him to the southern end of the market which triggered a storm of protest. Agitated crowds came forward from all directions with locally-made arms. Suddenly, a cattle trader hit the police officer, triggering police retaliation. The police personnel opened fire on the armed mob in the busy market, killing hundreds of them. The official investigation report stated that the number of casualties was around 4,500.

Prior to the incident, in January 1922 at Chandaikona, which is around 20 kilometers away from the place of the incident on the border of Bogra and Pabna, the policemen prevented volunteers from boycotting goods at the weekly market. The people got furious and snatched the rifle from the hands of the policemen and threw it in the Fuljor river near the market. In this incident the police became vindictive towards the Congress workers and public in the area.

== Legacy and analysis ==
The event, not well documented, was revived with the rediscovery in Bangladesh in the late 20th-century of "a rarely found account of Bengali youth leader and independence activist Abdur Rashid Tarkabagish titled 'Shadhinota Shangramer Rakta Shiri Salanga (Salanga: The Blood Stained-Step to the Struggle for Independence)", which stated that thousands of people died and that the bodies were thrown into the Bengali river or buried in a mass grave.

According to the Maulana Abdur Rashid Tarkabagish Memorial Library, the number of deaths ranged from 1,500 to 4,500 people. A mass graveyard remains near Salanga Bazar at Rahmatganj, where on 27 January the Salanga Day is annually observed in the memory of the victims, the centennial of which was on 27 January 2022.

== See also ==
- Massacre of Indian civilians by British colonizers
  - Jallianwala Bagh massacre
  - Munshiganj Raebareli massacre
  - Qissa Khwani massacre
  - Spin Tangi massacre
  - Takkar massacre
  - Vellaloor massacre
  - Vidurashwatha massacre
