= Ullapara Science College =

Ullapara Science College উল্লাপাড়া বিজ্ঞান কলেজ

Location
- Jhikira, Ullapara; Bangladesh
- Coordinates: 24.3199°N 89.5674°E

Information
- Type: Higher secondary school
- Established: 1994
- Founder: M. Akbar Ali
- School board: Rajshahi Education Board
- Campus size: 1.76 acres (0.71 ha)

Ullapara Science College (also referred to as USC) is a higher secondary school situated in Jhikira, Ullapara under Sirajganj District, Bangladesh. It's institute code (EIIN) is 128674.

== History ==
In 1992, M. Akbar Ali, then the member of parliament for the local Sirajganj-4 constituency, bought 1.76 acres in the Jhikira area of Ullapara. He and his wife, Momena Ali, founded Ullapara Science College on the land in 1994.

M. Akbar Ali formed a second school, Momena Ali Science School, on the same plot in 2002. It constructed a three storied academic building on the southeastern side of the property.

Two of the college's residence halls named after the founders, a Bangladesh Nationalist Party politician and his wife, were renamed in 2019 to honour the then local MP (an Awami League politician) and his wife. Akbar Ali Hall (2005) became Tanveer Imam Hall and Momena Ali Chhatra Hall (2003) became Mahim Imam Chhatra Hall.

When Momena Ali Science School outgrew their facilities, they agreed to transfer their three storied academic building to Ullapara Science College in exchange for being able to build a new campus on another parcel of land the college leased from the Roads and Highways Department. Construction was to begin in 2019 and the transfer was to be completed in 2021, but as of November 2023 the arrangement was hung up in court.
