= Md. Shafiqul Islam (Sirajganj politician) =

Bangladeshi politician

Birmuktijoddha Md.Shafiqul Islam
- বীরমুক্তিযোদ্ধা মো:শফিকুল ইসলাম

Member of Parliament for Sirajganj-4
- In office 30 January 2024 – 6 August 2024
- Preceded by: Tanveer Imam
- Succeeded by: Rafiqul Islam Khan
- In office 29 January 2009 – 24 January 2014
- Preceded by: M Akbar Ali
- Succeeded by: Tanveer Imam

Personal details
- Born: 5 May 1952 (age 74) Ullahpara thana, Sirajganj District, East Bengal, Dominion of Pakistan
- Party: Bangladesh Awami League

Md. Shafiqul Islam (born 5 May 1952) is a Bangladesh Awami League politician and a Jatiya Sangsad member representing the Sirajganj-4 constituency.

In 2018, he was elected unopposed to the chairmanship of Ullapara Upazila Parishad. He resigned the chairmanship in November 2023 to be nominated by the Awami League for the Sirajganj-4 seat in parliament again. He won the seat in the 2024 Bangladeshi general election.
