= Abdul Hamid Talukder =

Bangladeshi politician

- আবদুল হামিদ তালুকদার

Member of Parliament for Sirajganj-4
- In office 3 March 1988 – 6 December 1990
- Preceded by: Abdul Latif Mirza
- Succeeded by: M Akbar Ali

Personal details
- Born: Sirajganj
- Party: Jatiya Party

Abdul Hamid Talukder is a politician from Sirajganj District of Bangladesh. He was elected a member of parliament from Sirajganj-4 in the 1988 Bangladeshi general election.

== Career ==
Abdul Hamid Talukder is a lawyer in Sirajganj Judge's Court. He was elected a member of parliament from the Sirajganj-4 constituency as an Jatiya Party candidate in the 1988 Bangladeshi general election.
