= List of Indian independence movements =

This is a list of movements, protests and armed uprisings against the British Empire or its policies during the Indian independence movement.

For the history of Indian independence movement, see Indian independence movement.

== List ==
Name	Belligerents	British and Allies	Result	Casualties
Indian Rebellion of 1857 (1857–1858)	Mughal Empire Jhansi State Sepoys	United Kingdom: East India Company	British Victory	6,000 British dead. 800,0000 and more Indians dead due to combat and war related famine.
Munda Rebellion (1899–1900)	Birsa Munda and tribals	India	British Victory	Unknown
Champaran Satyagraha (1917)	Gandhi and farmers	India Planters	Planters to reimburse the peasants 25% of unlawfully collected funds.	No casualties
Non-cooperation movement (1919–1922): Chauri Chaura incident	Indian nationalists: Indian National Congress	India	See Aftermath	Chauri Chaura incident: 22 Imperial Indian Police officers dead due to burns.; 3 protestors dead, 6 died in police custody.; 225 protestors arrested.
Salt March and Civil Disobedience (1929–1931): Qissa Khwani massacre	Indian nationalists: Gandhi and protestors; Khudai Khidmatgar	India	See Impact	Protestors: Over 60,000 Indians jailed for breaking the Salt Law.; Qissa Khwani massacre: 20 demonstrators killed (British claim); 400 demonstrators killed (Local sources)
Quit India Movement (1942–1945)	Indian nationalists: Indian National Congress; Khudai Khidmatgar; Bolshevik–Leninist Party of India, Ceylon and Burma	United Kingdom: (British Raj) India; Supported by: All-India Muslim League; Hindu Mahasabha; Communist Party of India	See Result of the movement	British: 63 officers killed; 2,000 officers wounded; 200 officers fled or defected; Indian nationalists: 1,028 killed (British estimates); 4,000-10,0000 killed (Congress estimates); 3,125 wounded; Over 100,000 arrested
Axis collaborators in World War II (1943–1945)	Axis Japan: Azad Hind; Germany: Indian Legion; Italy: Battaglione Azad Hindoustan	Allies United Kingdom: (British Raj) India	British and Allies Victory	Azad Hind and the Indian National Army: 2,615 dead and missing.
Royal Indian Navy mutiny (1946)	Royal Indian Navy Mutineers	India	Bloodless Conflict: Mutineers surrender to British authorities.	No casualties
