= Government Akbar Ali College =

Govt. Akbar Ali College
- সরকারী আকবর আলী কলেজ
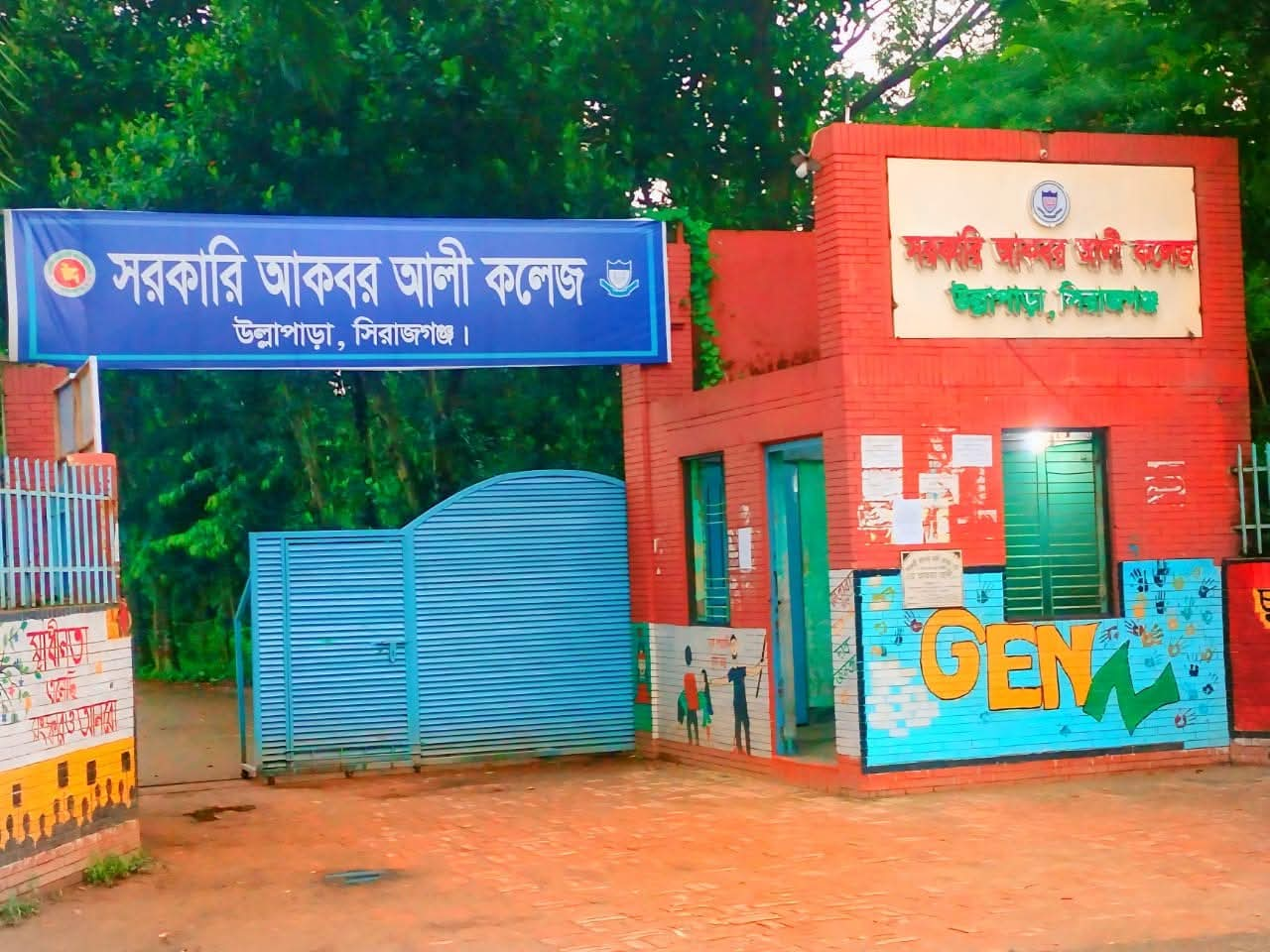

Location
- Ullapara Upazila, Sirajganj District; Bangladesh; 24.3132°N 89.5672°E

Information
- Founder: M Akbar Ali, Muslim Politician (1882-1969)
- School district: Rajshahi Education Board
- Principal: Professor Md. Nurul Alam
- Gender: coed
- Enrollment: 10,000+
- Language: Bengali
- Campus size: 10.32 acres (4.18 ha)
- Website: gaac.edu.bd

Govt. Akbar Ali College is an honors level college in Ullahpara Upazila of Sirajganj District, Bangladesh.

== History ==
Syed Akbar Ali, the former member of parliament for the Sirajganj-4 constituency of Bangladesh, founded Government Akbar Ali College in July 1970, on a plot of about 10.32 acres (4.18 ha) in what was then Sirajganj Sub-division, East Pakistan. The college was nationalized in 1984. Passing HSC from this college many students are studying country's best universities.

== Academics ==
The college is co-educational.

=== Curriculum ===
The college's curriculum includes traditional intermediate level academic subjects. Students have to select one of the three major programs: Arts and Humanities, Commerce, or Science. It also includes traditional undergraduate programme (degree and honours) on various subjects. The honours subjects are:

- Bengali
- English
- History
- Islamic Studies
- Economics
- Philosophy
- Political Science
- Chemistry
- Physics
- Mathematics
- Botany
- Zoology
- Accounting
- Management
