= Munshiganj Raebareli massacre =

The Munshiganj Raebareli massacre was a massacre perpetrated by the Indian Imperial Police on 7 January 1921 at Munshiganj, Raebareli, India. The official death toll as per British historians was minimal, while other estimates put the death toll in the hundreds.

A large mob assembled in Raebareli, demanding release of their leaders. Veer Pal Singh opened fire and on hearing the firing sound, a detachment of mounted police fired randomly at crowd, killing many.

The total number of deaths are not recorded, although it was reported that the nearby Sai river turned red from the blood. This massacre is considered the second-biggest massacre by British colonial authorities, after only Jallianwala Bagh massacre in 1919. National Herald newspaper reported 13 deaths. Jawaharlal Nehru was present there and wrote in National Herald that ".. police had to fire though no one ordered to do so". A memorial of the massacre stands in Munshiganj. The British Governor of Uttar Pradesh Sir Harcourt Butler congratulated Sirdar Birpal Singh, the Taluqdar who opened fire on farmers and Commissioner and Deputy Commissioners also congratulated the Taluqdar for the incident. A memorial was erected in Raebareli in memory of the victims killed by police.

== See also ==
- Massacre of Indian civilians by British Colonial troops
  - Jallianwala Bagh massacre
  - Qissa Khwani massacre
  - Salanga massacre
  - Spin Tangi massacre
  - Takkar massacre
  - Vellaloor massacre
  - Vidurashwatha massacre
