= Shamsul Alam (Siraganj politician) =

Bangladeshi politician

Md. Shamsul Alam
- শামছুল আলম

Member of Parliament for Sirajganj-4
- In office February 1996 – June 1996
- Preceded by: Abdul Latif Mirza
- Succeeded by: Kazi Abdur Rashid

Personal details
- Born: Ullahpara Upazila, Sirajganj District
- Party: Bangladesh Nationalist Party

Md. Shamsul Alam is a Bangladesh Nationalist Party politician. He was elected as a member of parliament for Sirajganj-4 in the February 1996 Bangladeshi general election.

== Career ==
Alam is a lawyer and former general secretary of the Ullahpara Upazila Bangladesh Nationalist Party. He was elected as a member of parliament for Sirajganj-4 in the February 1996 Bangladeshi general election as an independent candidate.
