= Khaduly =

Also known as Khaduli, village in Bangladesh

Coordinates: 24.29°N 89.48°E

Khaduly or Khaduli is a village in Ullahpara Upazila, Sirajgonj District, Bangladesh.
