= Vidurashwatha massacre =

1938 massacre by British colonial police

The Vidurashwatha massacre occurred on 25 April 1938 at Vidurashwatha, when police opened fire on agitated farmers and killed 33 people, wounding more than 100. At least 90 rounds were fired by police on unarmed people who assembled to hoist the flag of the Indian National Congress. The massacre is an instance where the Congress-led freedom movement was violently suppressed by Sir Mirza Ismail, then Dewan of Mysore State. District Superintendent of Police A.S.Khalil started firing with his pistol on unarmed crowd and Government declared that only 10 people died, although total death was 33.

This massacre led to the Mizra-Patel Pact between Vallabhbhai Patel and Mirza Ismail, which permitted people to hoist the Congress' Flag in Mysore State.

== See also ==
- Massacre of Indian civilians by British Colonisers
  - Jallianwala Bagh massacre
  - Munshiganj Raebareli massacre
  - Qissa Khwani massacre
  - Salanga massacre
  - Spin Tangi massacre
  - Takkar massacre
  - Vellaloor massacre
