= Qazi Ataullah Khan =

Pashtun lawyer, writer, politician, and activist

- قاضي عطاء الله خان

Minister of Education
- In office 1946–1947

Member of the legislative assembly
- In office 1937–?

Minister of Revenue
- In office 1937–?

Personal details
- Born: 1895 Landi Yarghajo, Peshawar, British India (now Pakistan)
- Died: Lahore, Pakistan
- Cause of death: Blood cancer
- Children: 5 sons, 3 daughters
- Parent: Qazi Nasrullah Khan (father)
- Profession: Lawyer, politician

Qazi Ataullah Khan (1895–1952) was a Pashtun lawyer, writer, activist, and politician.

== Early life and education ==
Qazi Ataullah Khan was born in 1895 in the village Landi Arbab, Peshawar, in British India. He was the second son of Qazi Nasrullah Khan, a teacher and religious scholar. His family, natives to Landi Yarghajo, are of Khalil and Mohmand decent. The title Qazi was conferred upon his great-grandfather, Haji Talibuddin Rohani.

Qazi Ataullah received his early education at a local madrassa before attending the Mission School in Peshawar, where his father previously taught. He went to study law at Aligarh Muslim University graduating in 1918, after which he returned to Peshawar.

== Career and activism ==
In 1919, Qazi Ataullah attended a Pashtun rights rally organised by Abdul Ghaffar Khan in Charsadda. By 1921, he was Ghaffar Khan's friend and close associate. After several years of legal practise in Peshawar, he settled in Mardan in 1925 continuing to practice law while collaborating with Ghaffar Khan in the non-violent Society for the Reformation of Afghans/Pashtoons (Anjuman-e-Islah-e Afghania).

According to Ajmal Khattak, it was Qazi Ataullah who proposed renaming the organisation Khudai Khidmatgar upon its formation in 1929, following the Qissa Khwani massacre. In 1930, the British arrested him for his involvement in the Pashun rights movement; he was imprisoned for five years.

When the Frontier National Congress, an offshoot of the Indian National Congress, was formed in 1937, Qazi Ataullah was elected to the legislative assembly and appointed Minister of Revenue under Dr. Khan Sahib. Following the Congress's electoral victory in 1946, he became the Minister of Education, and served in office when the first education policy in North-West Frontier Province (NWFP) was enacted.

In 1947, the All-India Muslim League called for a referendum in which residents of NWFP would choose between Pakistan and India. The Congress opposed the referendum, arguing that the 1946 election results reflected the population's preference for a united India and that the referendum was unlawful. When their objections were overruled, the NWFP chapter of the Congress, headed by Dr. Khan Sahib gave, tabled a counter-proposal on 23 June 1947: that was the choice between Pakistan or an independent Pukhtoonistan. It was Qazi Ataullah Khan who formally introduced the Pukhtoonistan option in an assembly session, the first time it had been put forward in such a setting. The Congress ultimately boycotted the referendum. Pakistan declared independence on 14 August 1947.

In June 1948, Qazi Ataullah was arrested along with Ghaffar Khan and other Khudai Khidmatgar leaders; their property was confiscated. The following month, the Khudai Khidmatgar movement was banned by the Muslim League government under Chief Minister Abdul Qayyum Khan. Qazi Ataullah was initially held in a prison in Dera Ismail Khan before being transferred to Hyderabad, and later to Macch Prison, where fellow detainees included Khan Abdul Wali Khan, Abdul Aziz Khan, Arbab Abdul Ghafoor Khan, and Amir Muhammad Khan.

During his imprisionment, Qazi Ataullah wrote a four-volume history of the Pashtuns in Pashto, making him the first Pashtun author to document Pashtun history in that language

== Illness and death ==
While imprisoned, Qazi Ataullah's health declined steadily, though the government refused to provide medical care. He was eventually diagnosed with blood cancer. When his condition became critical in February 1952, he was transferred to Mayo Hospital in Lahore, where he died on 17 February 1952.. He was buried in Mardan.

Following his death, he came to be known among Pashtun activists as Ghazi Qazi, in recognition of his lifelong struggle for Pashtun rights and the manner in which the government had withheld medical care during his imprisonment.

== Personal life ==
Qazi Ataullah married the daughter of the Khans of Prang lineage in 1923; she was the niece of the then-Sahib e Haq. The couple had three sons and five daughters, including Anwar Sadullah. His brother Matiullah resided in England. Activist Shandana Humayun Khan is his great-granddaughter.
