= Dakshin Pustigasa =

Village in Rajshahi Division, Bangladesh

Dakshin Pustigasa is a village in Ramkrishnapur Union of Ullahpara Upazila, Sirajganj District in central Bangladesh. The population comprises about 3,500 people. Most of the people make their living through farming or agriculture work. There are some service holders also.

There are a government primary school, a secondary school for girls, and a dakhil madrasah in the village. Students of this village as well as students of nearby villages study in these schools.

The prominent philanthropist Abdul Jalil Mia, Additional Secretary to GoB, director general of the Bangladesh Rural Development Board, was born here.

Additionally, an office of Independent Bangla, the prominent newspaper in Bangladesh has been established in the village on 25 October 2019. Tree Tag Bangladesh, a specialized program of Disaster Perception (www.disasterperception.com) has been conducted in this village.
