= Haribhanga =

Village in Rajshahi Division, Bangladesh

- Location in Bangladesh
- Coordinates: 24°19.2′N 89°34′E
- Country: Bangladesh
- Division: Rajshahi Division
- District: Sirajganj District
- Time zone: UTC+6 (Bangladesh Time)

Haribhanga is a village situated in Salop Union of Ullahpara Upazila, Bangladesh. Nearby places are Mohonpur, Sheikhpara, Kansona, Salop, Gobindapur, Soguna, Gopalpur, Konabari, Kalipur, and Soratoil.
