= Spin Tangi massacre =

British colonial crime

Spin Tangi massacre د سپین تنګي خونړۍ پېښه
- Location: Spin Tangi, Domel, Bannu, North-West Frontier Province, British India (now Pakistan)
- Date: 24 August 1930; 96 years ago
- Target: Khudai Khidmatgar activists
- Attack type: Mass murder, Massacre
- Deaths: 80 protesters killed, about 300 arrested
- Perpetrators: Frontier Constabulary, British Indian Army

The Spin Tangi massacre (Pashto: د سپین تنګي خونړۍ پېښه) or Hathikhel massacre (د هاتيخېلو خونړۍ پېښه) refers to the killing of about 80 non-violent Pashtun protesters by the Frontier Constabulary and the British Indian Army on 24 August 1930 at the Spin Tangi village near Domel, in the Bannu district of the North-West Frontier Province of British India. This massacre was committed just three months after the Takkar massacre in Mardan and four months after the Qissa Khwani massacre in Peshawar.

== History ==
Throughout the summer of 1930 British authorities were seeking to break the communications of the Khudai Khidmatgar (KK) movement, and martial law was declared by the British on 16 August; they had banned both the KK and the Congress and had arrested Badshah Khan and others. A large protest gathering was organised at Hathikhel in Spin Tangi, by local Waziri tribal leaders and sympathizers of the KK movement, despite the restrictions of the British. A local Banuchi elder, Qazi Fazal Qadar, was fired upon by the arresting police, and in the ensuing violence some 80 protestors were killed and 300 were arrested. Captured in the violence, the wounded Qazi Fazal Qadar was dragged to the District Commissioner but died shortly afterwards. He was sentenced posthumously to 14 years imprisonment by the government, denied any religious rites and buried in Bannu prison.

Some sources give the number of the dead as 70.

== See also ==
- Massacre of Indian civilians by British Colonisers troops
  - Jallianwala Bagh massacre
  - Munshiganj Raebareli massacre
  - Qissa Khwani massacre
  - Salanga massacre
  - Takkar massacre
  - Vellaloor massacre
  - Vidurashwatha massacre
