= USCU =

USCU may refer to:

- U.S. Central Credit Union
- University of South Carolina Union
- University of South Carolina Upstate
- United States customary units

== See also ==
- USC (disambiguation)
