= Rafiqul Islam Khan =

Bangladeshi politician

Member of Parliament
- Incumbent
- Assumed office 17 February 2026
- Preceded by: Md. Shafiqul Islam
- Constituency: Sirajganj-4

Assistant Secretary-General of Bangladesh Jamaat-e-Islami
- Leader: Dr. Shafiqur Rahman

President of Bangladesh Islami Chhatrashibir
- In office January, 1994 – December, 1994
- Succeeded by: Hamid Hossain Azad

Personal details
- Born: Sirajganj
- Party: Bangladesh Jamaat-e-Islami
- Occupation: Politician

Rafiqul Islam Khan is a Bangladesh Jamaat-e-Islami politician and elected member of Parliament from Sirajganj-4. He is a former central president of Bangladesh Islami Chhatrashibir.
