= Sardar Ali Takkar =

Pakistani singer

Sardar Ali Takkar (Pashto: سردار علي ټکر, born 15 July 1956) in Takkar village (Takht Bai) Mardan is a Pakistani Pashto singer. He primarily sings the poetry of renowned Pashto poet Ghani Khan. Takkar is a graduate of the University and Technology in Peshawar, Pakistan. In recognition of his services to the field of music, the President of Pakistan bestowed him the Pride of Performance Award. On 23 March 2019, Takkar became a recipient of Tamgha-e-Imtiaz award for the recognition of his "services rendered for Pashto music". It was presented by the President of Pakistan.

== Education ==
He was born in 1956 at Takkar village (Takht Bhai) in Mardan, Khyber Pakhtunkhwa, Pakistan. He passed his matric examination from a school in his village. He did his intermediate from Government College Mardan. He completed his graduation in Mechanical Engineering from the University of Engineering and Technology, Peshawar. Aside from this he has also attended special courses in U.K and Canada.

== Early singing career ==
His university life provided him more chances to exhibit his hidden talent. Initially he presented his skills before his friends, in different musical programmes in the University. But in 1982 when Yar Muhammad Maghmum, a professor at the historic Edwardes College Peshawar, wanted to celebrate an evening with the legendary philosopher and poet Ghani Khan, but was unable to find a singer who was ready to meet the challenge of putting Ghani's poetry to music. One of his student, Quaid Muhammad Khan (Manki Sharif) was able to inform Takkar of this situation. When Takkar became aware of this, he agreed to sing in that programme. Some people also recorded this programme on audio cassette, which got so much prominence that music stores started selling it on a regular basis. In this way, his debut album (solely based on Ghani khan's poetry) touched the market incidentally. In 2014 he performed at Nobel peace prize ceremony in Oslo, when Malala Yousafzai was getting Nobel Peace Prize Award. His song was based on the promotion of girls education. Since 2010 he is working in Voice of America as an international broadcaster.

== Pakistan Television ==
It was in those days when a program for youths named "Zalmey Kool" (Young Generation) used to broadcast from the Radio Pakistan. Takkar for the first time not only played different instruments but also sang two ghazals in that program. After that, he also had the opportunity to record a program at the Peshawar Center of Pakistan Television Vision (PTV).

== Soviet War in Afghanistan ==
In 1984, Takkar left for Afghanistan to his roots. His stay in Afghanistan helped him become able to sing other varieties of pashto music and his singing from Afghanistan also brought him prominence back at home. In recognition of his unforgettable services to Pashto music, the government of Pakistan awarded him with the "Presidential Award for Pride of Performance". He is also a recipient of numerous awards and certificates from a number of cultural organisations.
