= Takkar massacre =

Colonial massacre by the British Indian Army

Takkar massacre د ټکر خونړۍ پېښه
- Location: Takkar, Mardan, Colonial India (now Pakistan)
- Date: 28 May 1930; 96 years ago
- Target: Khudai Khidmatgar Activists
- Attack type: Mass murder, Massacre
- Deaths: 70 villagers killed and 150 wounded
- Perpetrator: British Indian Army

The Takkar massacre (Pashto: د ټکر خونړۍ پېښه) occurred on 28 May 1930 in Takkar, British India, where non-violent Pashtun protesters were brutally killed by the British Indian Army, just a month after the Qissa Khwani massacre in Peshawar. Approximately 70 people lost their lives, and 150 were wounded when local villagers attempted to prevent the British forces from arresting activists of the Khudai Khidmatgar movement.

== Course of events ==
At that time, the Khudai Khidmatgar freedom movement was gaining significant momentum. After Peshawar and Utmanzai, Takkar became a key stronghold of the movement. On 26 May 1930, the British colonial authorities, led by police officer Mr. Murphy and accompanied by a police force, arrived in Takkar with the intent to arrest key leaders of the movement, including Malik Masim Khan, Salar Shamroz Khan, Salar Sarbuland khan, Malik Khan Badshah, Pir Shahzada, and Malik Hameed of Fazalabad. These leaders refused to surrender, leading to a heated confrontation that escalated into a clash the following day. During the unrest, Mr. Murphy, on horseback, attempted to force his way into a protest procession and was killed.

In retaliation, a large contingent of colonial troops launched an assault on the village, an event that etched Takkar into history. The tragedy inspired the creation of poignant folksongs, such as "Pa Takkar jang de golay warege," which remains popular today, capturing the sorrowful atmosphere of that day. According to the Pashto book Da Khpal Waakaye Tarun, 70 people were killed and 150 wounded in the massacre. To honour the memory of those who lost their lives, a monument has been erected.

== See also ==
- Massacre of local civilians by British Colonisers
  - Jallianwala Bagh massacre
  - Munshiganj Raebareli massacre
  - Qissa Khwani massacre
  - Salanga massacre
  - Spin Tangi massacre
  - Vellaloor massacre
  - Vidurashwatha massacre
