= Hossain Toufique Imam =

Bangladeshi politician (1939–2021)

- হোসেন তৌফিক ইমাম
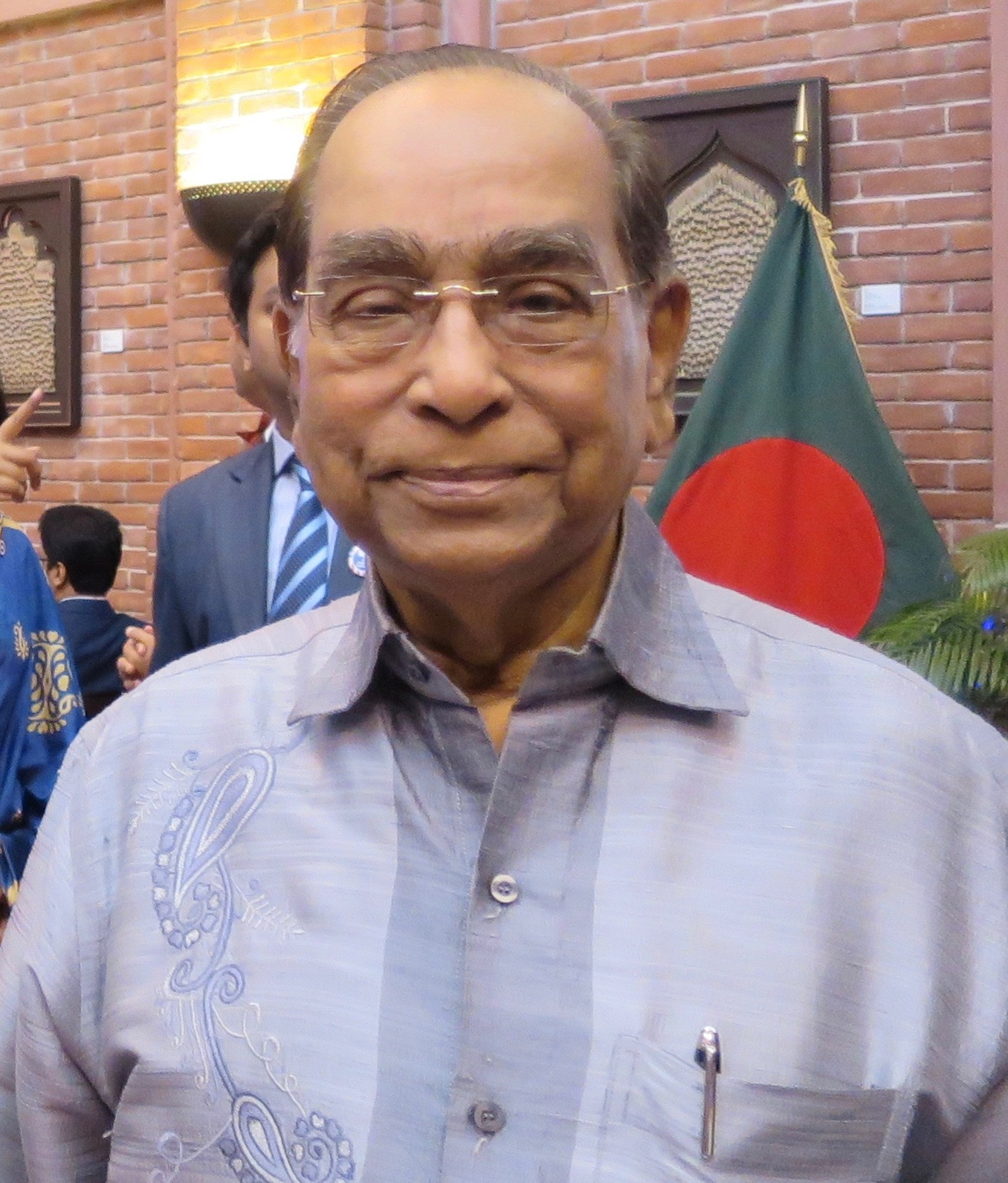
- Imam in 2016

Personal details
- Born: 15 January 1939 Bengal Presidency, British India
- Died: 4 March 2021 (aged 82) Dhaka, Bangladesh
- Party: Bangladesh Awami League
- Children: Tanveer Imam

Hossain Toufique Imam (15 January 1939 – 4 March 2021) was a Bangladesh Awami League politician and political advisor to Prime Minister Sheikh Hasina of Bangladesh. His rank was equivalent to a cabinet minister.

== Early life ==
Imam was born on 15 January 1939. He completed a B.A. in economics from Rajshahi University and an M.A. in economics from Dhaka University. He completed a post graduate diploma from London School of Economics in development administration.

== Career ==
HT Imam was a key figure during the Liberation War, he served as the cabinet secretary in the Mujibnagar government; the first administrative body dedicated to envisioning an independent Bangladesh. He was the political advisor to the Prime Minister Sheikh Hasina of Bangladesh. He blamed the Inter Service Intelligence for facilitating the July 2016 Dhaka attack. Imam was accused of interfering in the 2018 Bangladeshi general election. Dhaka Times reported that Towfiq orchestrated fraud in the elections by giving instructions to officials to stuff at least 30 percent of the ballot papers the night before the voting day. He was also accused of taking money to dictate transfers and promotions in the bureaucracy.

== Personal life ==
Imam's son, Tanveer Imam, was elected to parliament from Sirajganj-4 as a candidate of the Bangladesh Awami League in January 2014.

== Death ==
Imam died on 4 March 2021 at the Combined Military Hospital in Dhaka, after suffering from age-related problems coupled with kidney complications.
