= Abdur Rashid Tarkabagish =

Bangladeshi politician (1900–1986)

Mawlana Abdur Rashid Tarkabagish

3rd President of Awami League
- In office 10 October 1957 – 25 January 1966
- General Secretary: Sheikh Mujibur Rahman
- Preceded by: Huseyn Shaheed Suhrawardy
- Succeeded by: Sheikh Mujibur Rahman

Member of the Constituent Assembly of Bangladesh
- In office 1971–1973
- Constituency: NE-25 (Pabna-II)

Member of the National Assembly of Pakistan
- In office 1955–1958

Member of the Constituent Assembly of Pakistan
- In office 10 August 1947 – 24 October 1954

Member of the Bengal Legislative Assembly
- In office 1937–1945

Personal details
- Born: Khandakar Sayed Abdur Rashid; 27 November 1900 Salanga, Bengal, British India
- Died: 20 August 1986 (aged 85) Dhaka, Bangladesh
- Party: All-India Muslim League (1936–1947); Muslim League (1947–1952); Awami League (1952–1975); Gano Azadi League (1976–1986)

Personal life
- Education: Darul Uloom Deoband; Mazahir Uloom

Religious life
- Religion: Islam
- Denomination: Sunni
- Jurisprudence: Hanafi
- Movement: Deobandi
- Arabic name
- Personal (Ism): ʿAbd al-Rashīd عبد الرشيد
- Patronymic (Nasab): ibn Abī Isḥāq إبن أبي إسحاق
- Epithet (Laqab): Tarkabāghīsh تركباغيش

Khandakar Abdur Rashid (Bengali: খন্দকার আব্দুর রশীদ), better known as Abdur Rashid Tarkabagish (Bengali: আব্দুর রশীদ তর্কবাগীশ; 27 November 1900 – 20 August 1986) was a Bangladeshi politician and Islamic scholar. His career spans from the anti-colonial independence movement to the establishment of both Pakistan and Bangladesh. Tarkabagish was the second president of the All Pakistan Awami Muslim League, and served as a member of the National Assembly of Pakistan and later the Parliament of Bangladesh. Despite being a member of the treasury bench, he opposed what he considered to be the repressive mentality of the Nurul Amin government towards the Bengali language movement.

== Early life and education ==
Khandakar Sayed Abdur Rashid was born on 27 November 1900 to an aristocratic Bengali Muslim Sayed Peer family titled Khandakar in the village of Tarutia situated in Ullahpara, Sirajganj (then under the Pabna District of the Bengal Presidency). His father, Sayed Abu Ishaq Khandakar, traces his lineage to Shah Darwish Dewan Sayed Mahmud, a Sufi Muslim figure claimed to be descended from Imam Husayn through his son Imam Zayn Al Abedin, who had arrived in the region from Baghdad during 1303 AD, he was a follower of the Tariqah of Sayed Abdul Qadir Jilani.

From an early age, he developed a sense of patriotism. At the age of thirteen, he assembled helpless milk sellers against the local zamindars and mahajans and demanded that they pay them a fair price for milk. By the age of twenty-one, he was leading marchers in a non-violent protest for independence at the Salanga bazaar in Raiganj, when the crowd was fired upon, killing hundreds of people. The events of 27 January 1922 are now referred to as the Salanga massacre in Bangladesh, and memorialised by "Salanga Day" annually.

He later decided to pursue higher Islamic studies, and thus entered the United Provinces and Lahore, where was educated in Deobandi institutions such as Darul Uloom Deoband and Mazahir Uloom. He received his degree in logic and reasoning (tarka) and was honoured with the title of Tarkabagish (master of reasoning).

== Political career ==
Tarkabagish joined the Muslim League in 1936. From the party he participated in the election and earned his place in the Bengal Legislative Assembly in 1937 and in 1946. At the budget session of the East Bengal Legislative Assembly on 21 February 1952, Tarkabagish heavily criticized the killing of several protesters near Dhaka Medical College.

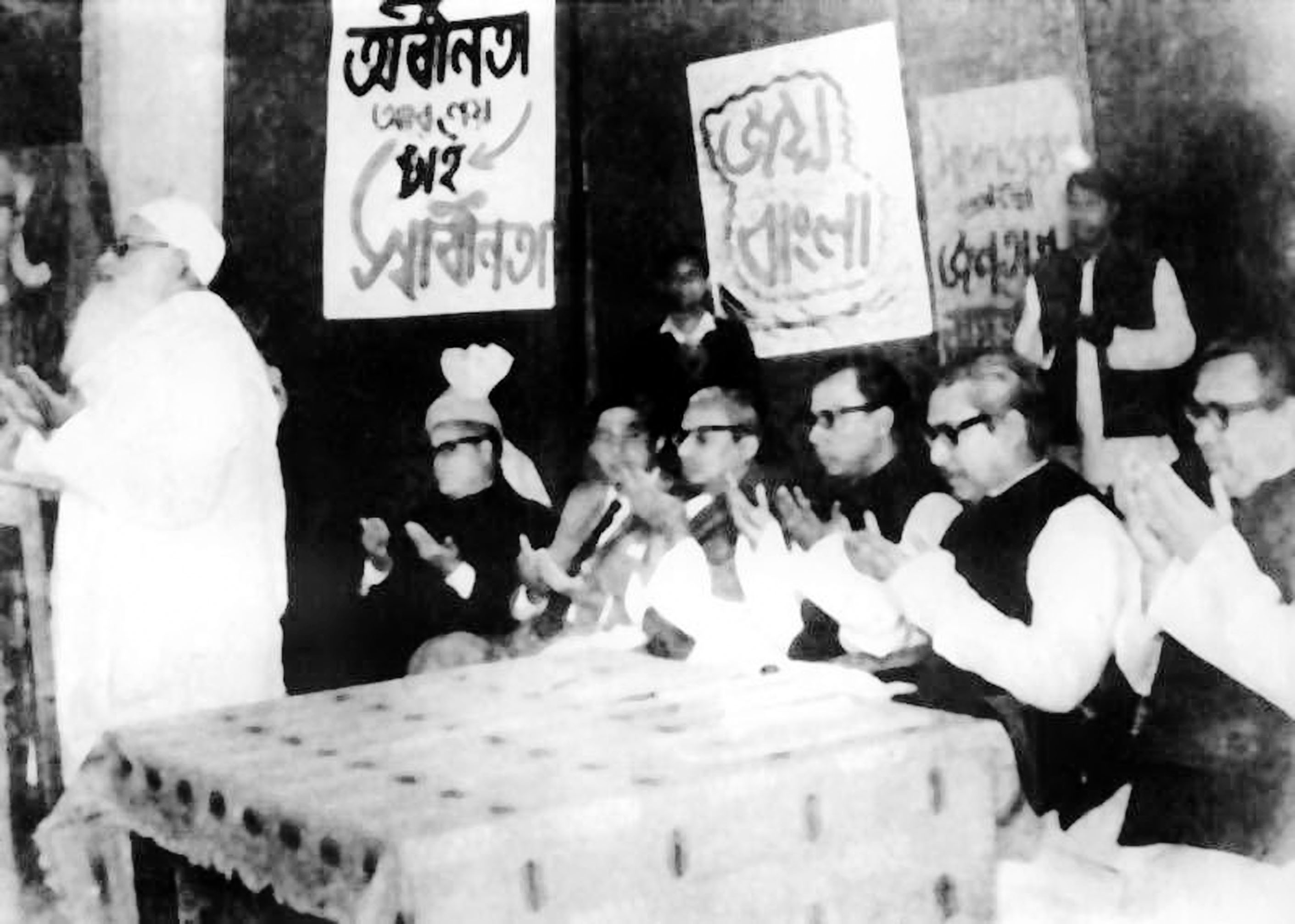
Abdur Rashid Tarkabagish at a meeting with Mujib and Tajuddin

Tarkabagish asked the leader of the house, Nurul Amin, to formulate an inquiry and to visit to the wounded students before proceeding the session. But as Amin refused the proposal, he walked out of the assembly and subsequently retired from Muslim League Parliamentary Party on 23 February 1952. He also expressed gratitude to the dead and wounded activists of the movement.

Tarkabagish protested the police firing on and killing of students on 21 February 1952, in the assembly. He also made his speech in Bengali to respect his mother tongue and martyrs of the language movement. He was arrested on 23 February and kept in jail until 1 June. Then he joined Awami Muslim League (now the Awami League) and was again elected a member of the assembly in 1954 from United Front. He was also elected as the member of the Constituent Assembly of Pakistan in 1956.

Tarkabagish was elected as the acting president of the Awami League in 1957, and then the president of the Awami League from 1964, a position in which he served till 1967.

=== After the independence of Bangladesh ===
Tarkabagish presided over at the first session of the Jatiya Sangsad of Bangladesh in 1972. He was again elected a member from Awami League in 1973. After the assassinations of the founding father and then-President of Bangladesh, and almost his entire family and several relatives on 15 August 1975, by a group of military officers in an attempted coup, and subsequent coups and countercoups, Tarkabagish himself formed a party named Gano Azadi League in 1976. During the regime of Ershad he played a role in the formation and activities of 15 party alliance that took part in the movement against Ershad. He played an important role as one of the leaders of the alliance in the movement against military rule of Hussein Mohammad Ershad.He was all along uncompromising towards fundamentalism and sectarianism. Maulana Abdur Rashid Tarkabagish was honoured with the Independence Day Award (posthumously) by the Government of Bangladesh in 2000 AD.

== Death and legacy ==
Tarkabagish died in Dhaka on 20 August 1986. He was honored with an Independence Day Award in 2000.

=== Controversy ===
After the assassination of Mujibur Rahman, Tarkabagish went against his former comrade and praised the mastermind of the assassination Khondaker Mostaq Ahmad saying, "May Allah bless the President [Moshtaque] in establishing rule of law, peace and happiness in the country by uprooting corruption."

== Citations ==
- Al Helal, B (2003), Bhasha Andoloner Itihas (History of the Language Movement), Agamee Prakashani, Dhaka, ISBN 984-401-523-5 (in Bengali)
