= Abdul Latif Mirza =

Bangladeshi politician

- আবদুল লতিফ মির্জা

Member of the Bangladesh Parliament for Sirajganj-4
- In office June 1996 – October 2001
- Preceded by: Shamsul Alam
- Succeeded by: M Akbar Ali

Personal details
- Born: 26 June 1947 Purba Bankirat, Ullahpara thana, British India
- Died: 5 November 2007 (aged 60) Sirajganj, Bangladesh
- Party: Awami League
- Other political affiliations: Jatiya Samajtantrik Dal

Military service
- Allegiance: Bangladesh
- Branch/service: Mukti Bahini
- Battles/wars: Bangladesh Liberation War

Abdul Latif Mirza (1947 – 2007) was a Bangladeshi Awami League politician. He was the member of parliament from Pabna-4 in 1979 and Sirajganj-4 in 1996.

== Biography ==
Abdul Latif Mirza was born on 26 June 1947 in Purba Bankirat village of what is now Ullahpara Upazila, Bangladesh.

Mirza was a member of the Mukti Bahini and fought in the Bangladesh Liberation War. He had formed the Mirza Abdul Latif Bahini in Sirajganj. which had 8 to 10 thousand personnel during the war. He had started the force with 15 members and seven rifles. He had initially named it Polashdanga Youth Camp. He was elected to Sirajganj-4 constituency (Ullapara).

== Death ==
Mirza died on 5 November 2007 in Sirajganj.
