= Elai Kaatha Amman Temple =

Coordinates: 9.997475°N 78.40826°E

Ezhai Kaatha Amman Temple (Tamil: ஏழை காத்த அம்மன் கோயில்) is a Hindu temple situated in the Madurai district of Tamil Nadu, India. This temple is exactly located in a place called "Koyil Patti", within the Panchayat limit of Kurichipatti. Koyil Patti is approximately 14 km from Melur. Elai Kaatha Amman Temple comes under the place called Vellalur which is called by people as Vellalur Nadu (Nadu means country).

Ezhai Kaatha Amman Temple and Valladikaarar Temple are two important temples for these people. Valladikaarar and Ezhai Kaatha Amman are a brother and a sister. The festival for Ezhai Kaatha Amman take place in the month of September and for Valladikarar take place in the month of March. During the festival time of both the temples people fast for 15 days without eating meatarian foods and flour made foods like Idli, Dosai, Vadai, Chapati, Puri, etc. They will not break or cut the coconut and lemon trees and construction works won't take place (No mixing of cement or mud). And even the hotels won't be running, as they celebrate this festival with joy more than any other festivals like Deepavali or Pongal.

Seven young girls of about 10 years of age around more than 65 villages which comes under Vellalur are selected as daughters of the above mentioned Ezhai Kaatha Amman and they are respected as goddesses as well as they will do holy service for entire 15 days. These seven girls are selected by Ezhai Kaatha Amman Temple's priest (Poosaari - Melavalasai).
