= USC =

USC or usc may refer to:

== Education ==
=== United States ===
- Universidad del Sagrado Corazón, Santurce, Puerto Rico
- University of South Carolina, Columbia, South Carolina
  - University of South Carolina System, a state university system of South Carolina
- University of Southern California, Los Angeles, California
  - USC Trojans, the university's athletics team
- University of Southern Colorado, Pueblo, Colorado
- Upper St. Clair High School, Upper St. Clair, Pennsylvania
- Utica School of Commerce, a defunct business college in Utica, New York

=== Worldwide ===
- Shih Chien University, Taipei and Kaohsiung, Taiwan
- Ullapara Science College, Rajshahi Division, Bangladesh
- University of San Carlos, Cebu City, Philippines
- University of Santiago de Compostela, Santiago de Compostela, Spain
- University of Science and Culture, Tehran, Iran
- University Senior College, a year 11 and 12 school in Adelaide, South Australia
- University of South China, Hengyang, Hunan, China
- University of the Southern Caribbean, Maracas Valley, Trinidad and Tobago
- University of the Sunshine Coast, Queensland, Australia

== Government ==
- United States Code, the official code of United States federal law
- United States Congress, the law-making body of the United States government
- Universal Social Charge, an income tax in Ireland
- Utility Stores Corporation, a Pakistani state-owned store chain
- United Somali Congress (1987–2004), a former major rebel organization

== Law enforcement ==
- Ulster Special Constabulary, a former reserve police force in Northern Ireland
- United States Constabulary (1946–1952), the security force of the U.S. Occupation Zone of West Germany

== Sports ==
- UEFA Super Cup, an annual association football super cup match
- United Soccer Coaches, an American organization
- United SportsCar Championship, a racing series in the United States and Canada
- Unity Sporting Club, an association football (soccer) club in Wenchi, Ghana
- USC Lion Soccer Club, an association football (soccer) club in Adelaide, Australia, playing in the South Australian Amateur Soccer League

== Miscellaneous ==
- USC (clothing retailer), a European clothing retailer with concessions inside Sports Direct stores
- USC Canada, a Unitarian development organization promoting agricultural biodiversity
- Heckler & Koch USC, a semiautomatic submachine gun
- Ubuntu Software Center, a discontinued software management system
- Uchinoura Space Center, a JAXA space vehicle launch facility
- Ulster Service Corps, a loyalist vigilante group in Northern Ireland
- Unified Soil Classification System, a system describing soil texture and grain size
- United Shipbuilding Corporation, the largest Shipbuilding Company in Russia
- United States customary units, a system of measurement
- WWE United States Championship, a wrestling event

== See also ==
- Pontifical University of the Holy Cross, a pontifical university in Rome
- Unitarian Universalist Service Committee, a relief organization affiliated with the Unitarian Universalist Association
