= Vidurashwatha =

- city
- Location in Karnataka, India Vidurashwatha (India)
- Coordinates: 13.61°N 77.52°E
- Country: India
- State: Karnataka
- District: Chikkaballapur

Languages
  - Official: Kannada
- Time zone: UTC+5:30 (IST)
- PIN: 561208

Vidurashwatha is a village located in the Gauribidanur taluk of Chikkaballapur district in the state of Karnataka, India. Situated near the Karnataka–Andhra Pradesh border and about 6 km from Gauribidanur, it played a significant role in the Indian independence movement. The place is home to Ashwatha Narayanaswamy temple. Besides the temple it is also home to hundreds of Naga deity idols made of stone.

== Etymology ==
The name Vidurashwatha is derived from that of a big Ashwatha (sacred fig) tree located in this village. According to a legend of the times of Mahabharata, this tree was planted by Vidura, a courtier in the kingdom of Dhritarashtra; and hence the name Vidurashwatha. In 2001, this ancient tree fell to the ground.

== History ==
Vidurashwatha is known as the Jalianwalabagh of southern India. Around 35 freedom fighters martyred while hoisting the flag of the Indian National Congress flag here. Veera Saudha is built on the memory of this freedom movement.
