= Salap High School =

Salap High School সলপ উচ্চ বিদ্যালয়
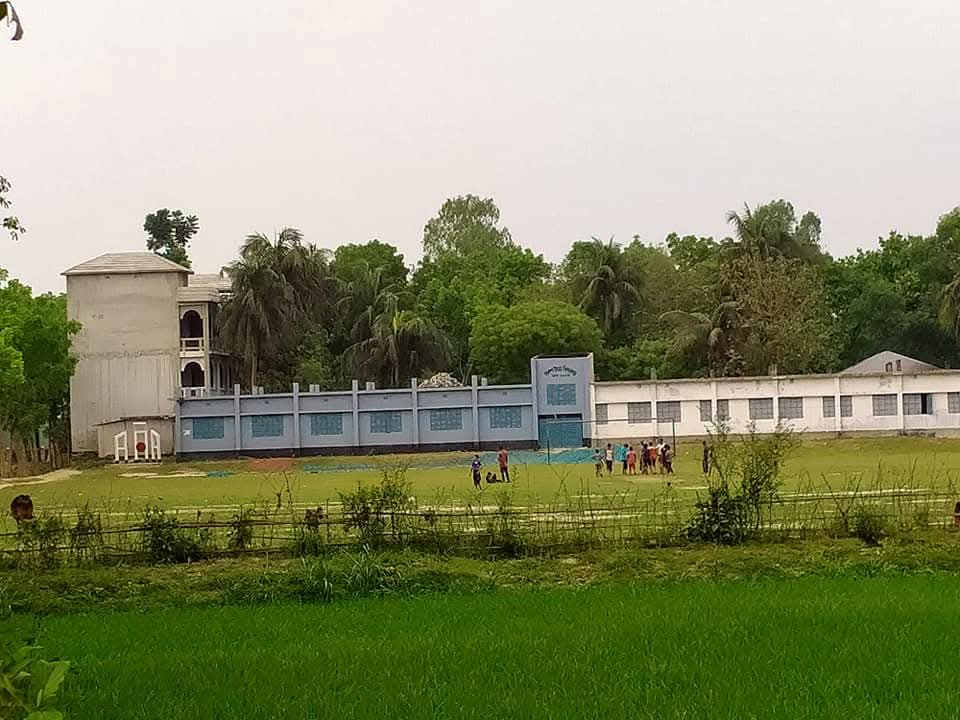
- Salap High School in 2024

Location
- Bangladesh
- Coordinates: 24.2897°N 89.6174°E

Information
- Type: MPO affiliated school
- Established: 1905
- School board: Board of Intermediate and Secondary Education, Rajshahi
- School code: EIIN 128555
- Grades: 6th to 10th
- Campus type: Urban

Salap High School (Bengali: সলপ উচ্চ বিদ্যালয়") is the oldest secondary school in Ullahpara Upazila, Sirajganj District, Bangladesh. It was established in 1905.

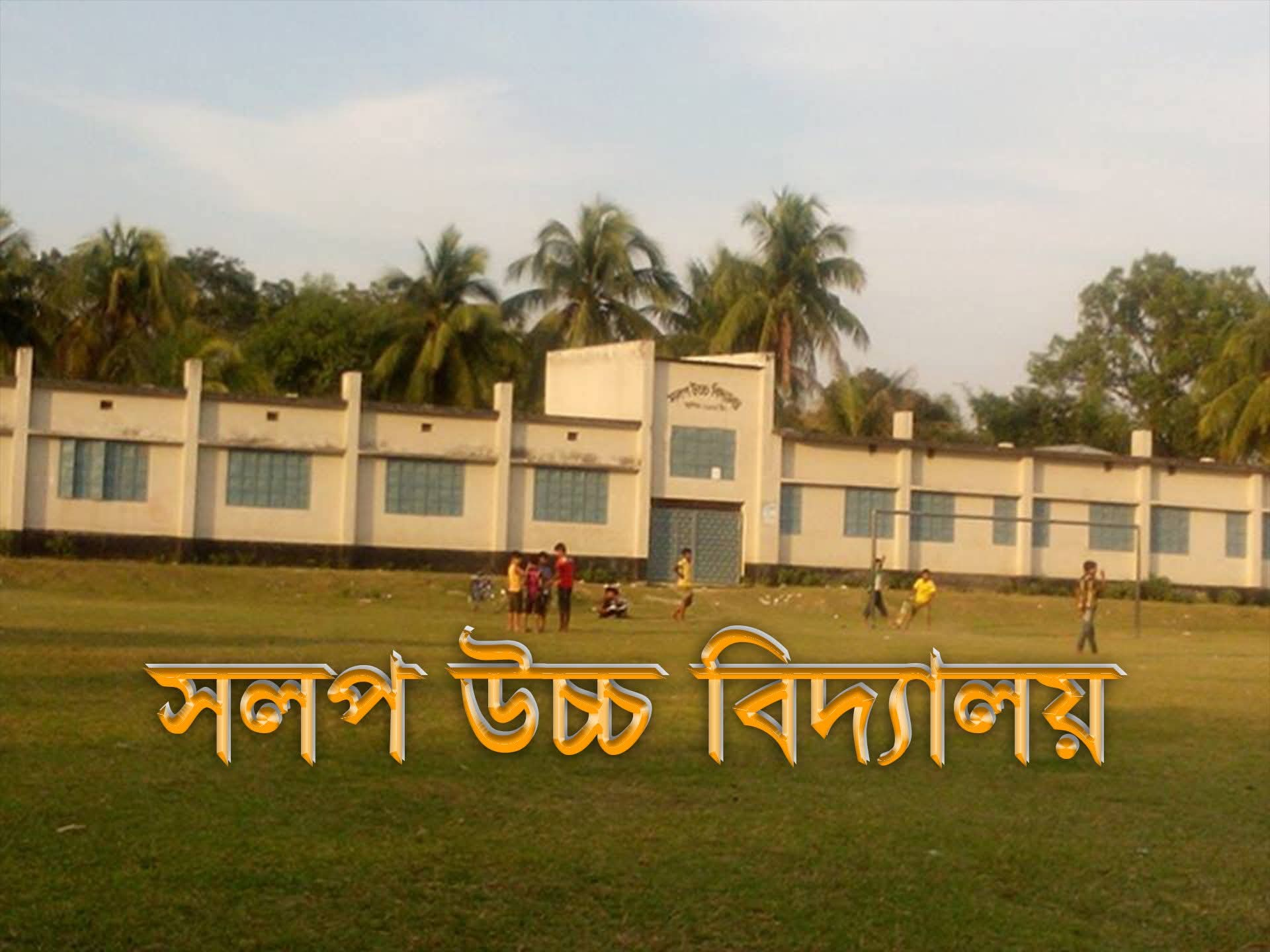
Salop High School in 2020
