= Qissa Khwani massacre =

Event during the independence movement in British India

Qissa Khwani Bazaar massacre د قصه خوانۍ بازار خونړۍ پېښه
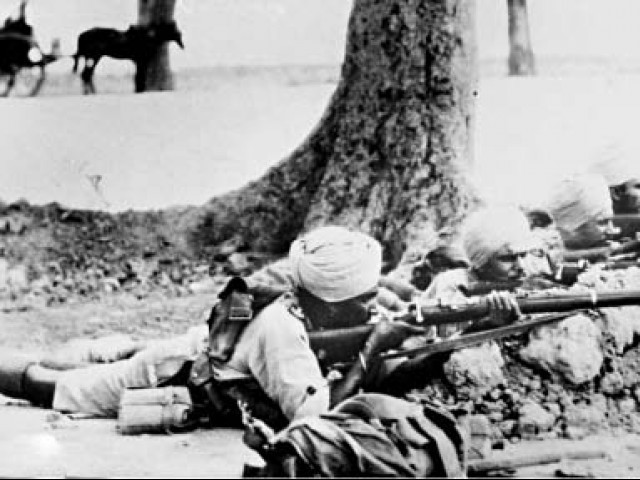
- British Indian troops in Peshawar during the demonstrations
- Location: Peshawar, North-West Frontier Province, British India (Present-day Khyber Pakhtunkhwa, Pakistan)
- Date: 23 April 1930; 96 years ago
- Target: Khudai Khidmatgar protestors
- Attack type: Massacre
- Deaths: 20 demonstrators killed according to official reports; 400 demonstrators killed according to local sources
- Perpetrator: British Indian Army

The Qissa Khwani massacre (Pashto: د قصه خوانۍ بازار خوڼۍ پېښه) in Peshawar, North-West Frontier Province, British India (modern day Khyber Pakhtunkhwa, Pakistan) on 23 April 1930 was an armoured vehicle-ramming attack and mass shooting of the unarmed civilian freedom fighters by the British colonial troops, which consequently became one of the defining moments of the independence movement in British India.

It was the first major confrontation between the British Indian Army and demonstrators in the city belonging to Abdul Ghaffar Khan's non-violent Khudai Khidmatgar (servants of God) movement against the British colonial government.

Contemporary estimates put the death toll between the official count of 20 and the figure of 400 put forth by Pakistani and Indian sources. The shooting of unarmed people triggered protests across British India and catapulted the newly formed Khudai Khidmatgar movement into prominence.

== Background ==
The Khudai Khidmatgar (literally Helpers in the name of God), led by Khan Abdul Ghaffar Khan, were a group of Muslims committed to the removal of British colonial rule through non-violent methods. On 23 April 1930, Ghaffar Khan was arrested after giving a speech in Utmanzai urging resistance to British colonial rule. Ghaffar Khan's reputation for uncompromising integrity and commitment to non-violence inspired most of the local townspeople to take the oath of membership and join the Khudai Khidmatgar in protest.

Simultaneous demonstrations were led by a cross section of civil society in and around Peshawar, led by Maulana Abdur Rahim Popalzai against discriminatory laws like the Frontier Crimes Regulation against the people of the province.

== Clashes ==
After other Khudai Khidmatgar leaders were arrested, a large crowd of the group gathered at the Qissa Khwani bazaar. As troops of the British Indian Army (BIA) moved into the bazaar, the crowd was loud and stones were thrown. A BIA dispatch rider was killed and his body burned. Two BIA armored cars drove into the square at high speed, killing several people. It is claimed that the crowd continued their commitment to non-violence, offering to disperse if they could gather their dead and injured, and if the British Indian Army left the square. The BIA refused to leave, so the protesters remained with the dead and injured. At that point, the BIA officers present ordered their troops to open fire with machine guns on the unarmed crowd. The Khudai Khidmatgar members willingly faced bullets, responding without violence. Instead, many members repeated the chant "God is great"(اللہُ اکبر) and clutched the Qur'an as they were shot.

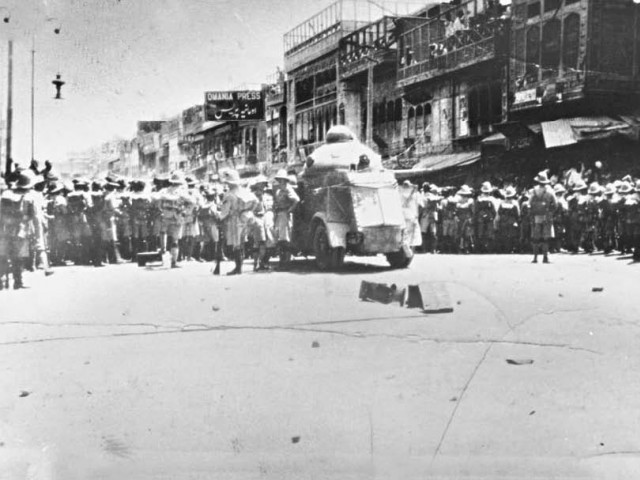
British Indian Army soldiers in Peshawar during the demonstrations

The exact number of deaths remains controversial— official figures give 20 dead while nationalist sources claimed several hundred were killed, with many more wounded. Two platoons of a respected British Indian Army regiment, the Royal Garhwal Rifles, refused to board buses that were to take them into Peshawar for anti-riot duty. A British civil servant wrote later that "hardly any regiment of the Indian Army won greater glory in the Great War (World War I) than the Garhwal Rifles, and the defection of part of the regiment sent shock waves through India, of apprehension to some, of exultation to others." The NCOs of the two platoons, including one led by Hawaldar Major Chandra Singh Garhwali, involved were sentenced to terms of up to eight years imprisonment.

The violence continued for six hours. Gene Sharp, who has written a study of nonviolent resistance, describes the scene on that day:

When those in front fell down wounded by the shots, those behind came forward with their chests bared and exposed themselves to the fire, so much so that some people got as many as twenty-one bullet wounds in their bodies, and all the people stood their ground without getting into a panic. . . . The Anglo-Indian paper of Lahore, which represents the official view, itself wrote to the effect that the people came forward one after another to face the firing and when they fell wounded they were dragged back and others came forward to be shot at. This state of things continued from 11 till 5 o'clock in the evening. When the number of corpses became too many, the ambulance cars of the government took them away.

== Aftermath ==
In Peshawar and the surrounding area, the Khudai Khidmatgar experienced some of the most extreme crackdowns against the Indian independence movement. Ghaffar Khan later wrote that this was because the British colonial government thought a non-violent Pashtun was more dangerous than a violent one; claiming that this led them to repeatedly provoke the movement into becoming violent, with little effect.

The massacre created numerous instances of unrest throughout British India. This resulted in King George VI (Emperor of India) launching a legal investigation into this matter. The British Commission brought the case forward to Chief Justice Naimatullah Chaudhry, a distinguished Judge of the Lucknow protectorate.

King George VI subsequently knighted Naimatullah, who had personally surveyed the area of the massacre and published a 200-page report criticizing the actions of the British Indian Army.

Olaf Caroe, then secretary to the Chief Commissioner, gave the following report of the event ("Public and Judicial Department. Civil Disobedience Campaign in NWFP. Response to Patel allegations". British Library reference number L/PJ/6/2007):

″I received a note on 23rd April evening from Sir Norman Bolton asking me to do what I could to arrange for the burial of as many of the casualties as possible during the night, in order to avoid the danger of a fresh riot occurring over the funeral procession. I spoke to R.S. Mehr Chand Khanna and asked him to bring me some of the leading Khilafists at the Municipal Library. He brought M. Abdurrab Nishtar; M. Ataullah Jan, Municipal Commissioner; M. Aurangzeb Khan, Vakil; Qazi Mohd Aslam, Vakil.

I informed these persons what was required and asked for their co-operation as peace-loving citizens and good Muslims. They agreed to do what they could and asked me to arrange for lorries, saying they would persuade the relatives to agree. I arranged for lorries through Shahji – one of C.C.’s orderlies – who is I believe a Peshawari and a Syed. During the night in this way we sent away seven or eight bodies in lorries. Some of them had no relatives and arrangements were made to pay for a mullah and to carry through the obsequies with all regard to religious rites. The next day Qazi Mohd Aslam came to see me and said that he was making himself unpopular by assisting in the matter. He gave me to understand that he could do no more. I fancy that the association of these four men with the action taken will put an end to any attempt to make capital of the incident.″

== See also ==
- Massacre of Indian civilians by British Colonisers
  - Jallianwala Bagh massacre
  - Munshiganj Raebareli massacre
  - Salanga massacre
  - Spin Tangi massacre
  - Takkar massacre
  - Vellaloor massacre
  - Vidurashwatha massacre
