= Khudai Khidmatgar =

Pashtun non-violent movement against British rule in India (1927-1949)

Khudai Khidmatgar خداۍ خدمتګار
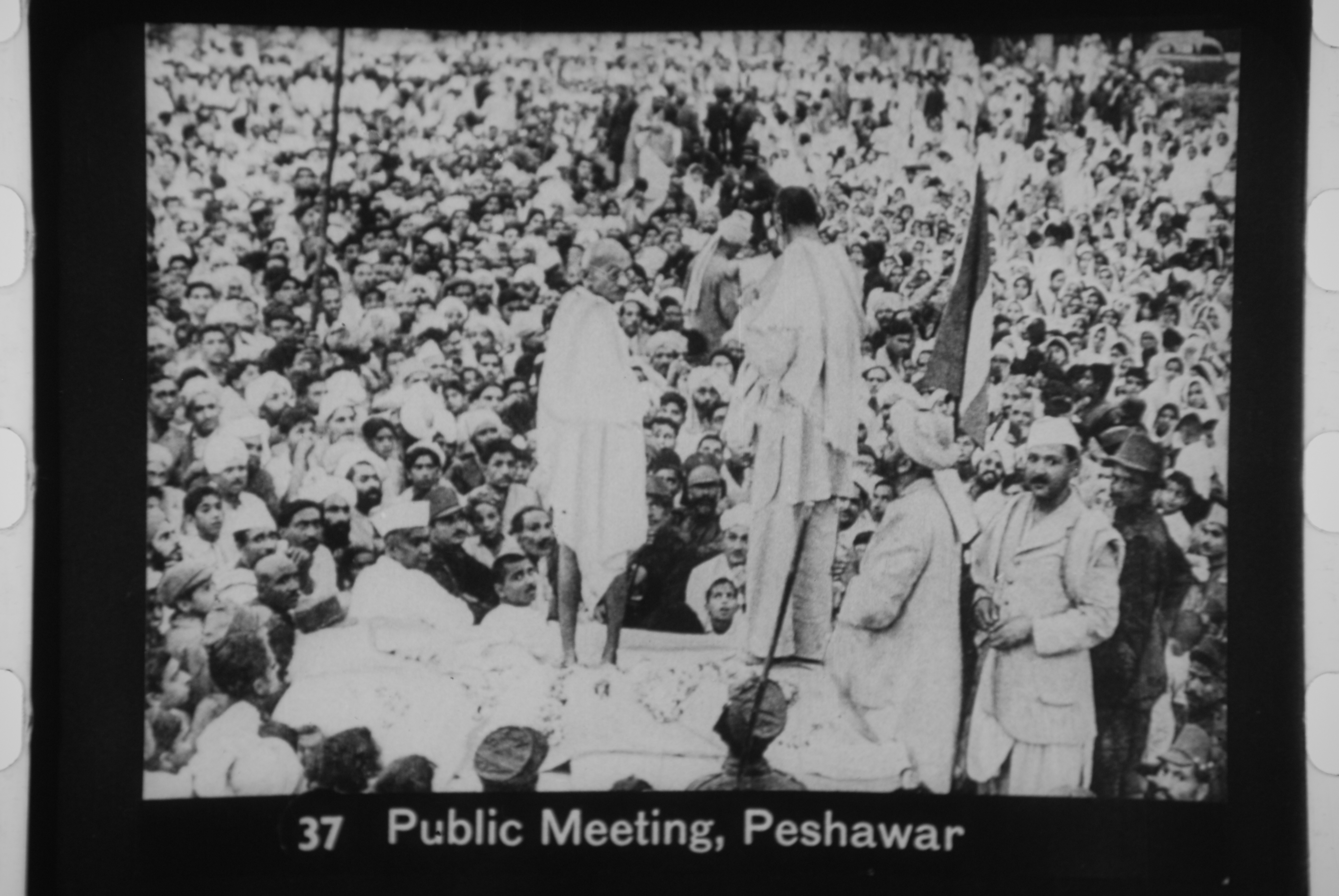
- Bacha Khan & Gandhi meeting Khudai Khidmatgar activists
- Founder: Abdul Ghaffar Khan
- Founded: 1929
- Dissolved: 1947
- Preceded by: Roshani movement
- Succeeded by: Weekh Zalmian
- Ideology: Anti-Imperialism; Hindu–Muslim unity; Composite nationalism
- Political position: Centre-left to left-wing
- National affiliation: Indian National Congress

Khudai Khidmatgar (Pashto: خداۍ خدمتګار, lit. 'servants of God') was an Indian, predominantly Pashtun, nonviolent resistance movement known for its activism against the British Raj in colonial India; it was based in the country's North-West Frontier Province (present-day Khyber Pakhtunkhwa in Pakistan).

Also called Surkh Posh or "Red Shirts" or "red-dressed", this was originally a social reform organisation focusing on education and the elimination of blood feuds. it was known as the Anjuman-e-Islah-e Afghania (society for the reformation of Afghans/Pashtoons). The movement was led by Abdul Ghaffar Khan, known locally as Bacha Khan, Badshah Khan, or Sarhadi Gandhi.

It gradually became more political as its members were being targeted by the British Raj. By 1929 its leadership was exiled from the province and large numbers were arrested. Seeking allies, leaders approached the All-India Muslim League and Indian National Congress; after being rebuffed by the former in 1929, the movement formally joined the Congress Party and played an important role in the Indian independence movement. The cooperation between Muslim Khudai Khidmatgar and predominantly Hindu Indian National Congress concerned the British, who persistently tried to sever this relationship. Due to pressure across India, the British colonial government finally released Bacha Khan and lifted restrictions on the movement. As part of the Government of India Act 1935, a limited male franchise was for the first time introduced in the North-West Frontier Province. In the 1937 elections, the Khudai Khidmatgars won in alliance with the Congress Party. Bacha Khan's brother Khan Abdul Jabbar Khan (Dr. Khan Sahib) was elected as the Chief Minister of the NWFP.

The Khudai Khidmatgar movement faced another crackdown for its role in the Quit India Movement after 1940; in that period it started facing increasing opposition from the Muslim League in the province. The Khudai Khidmatgars also won the 1946 elections in alliance with the Congress Party, and Dr Khan Sahib was re-elected as the Chief Minister.

The Khudai Khidmatgars strongly opposed the proposal for the partition of India, siding with the Indian National Congress and All India Azad Muslim Conference. When the Indian National Congress declared its acceptance of the partition plan without consulting the Khudai Khidmatgar leaders, Bacha Khan told the Congress "you have thrown us to the wolves."

In June 1947, the Khudai Khidmatgars declared the Bannu Resolution, demanding that the Pashtuns be given a choice to have an independent state of Pashtunistan, composing all Pashtun territories of British India, instead of being made to join Pakistan. However, the British Raj refused to comply with the demand of this resolution. In response, the Khudai Khidmatgars boycotted the 1947 NWFP referendum about the province joining Pakistan or India, citing that it did not have the options of the NWFP becoming independent or joining Afghanistan.

After the partition of India, the Khudai Khidmatgars faced a backlash from the new Pakistani government. The government of the Khudai Khidmatgars was dismissed and their movement banned, with many members of the organisation being targeted in the Babrra massacre that occurred on 12 August 1948. In Delhi, the Khudai Khidmatgar was revived by Faisal Khan in 2011 with a focus on promoting communal amity and aiding in disaster relief; it has a membership of around 5,000 persons.

== Origins ==
Formed out of the Society for the Reformation of Pashtuns (Anjuman-e-Islah-e-Afghan), it is initially targeted social reformation and launched campaigns against prostitution. Bacha Khan as its founder seemed to be influenced by the realisation that whenever Indians launched a rebellion against British colonial rule via military force they were always unsuccessful. The same could not be said when using non-violence against the British.

The movement started prior to the Qissa Khwani massacre, when a demonstration of hundreds of non-violent supporters were fired upon by a detachment of the British Indian Army in Peshawar. Its low point and eventual dissipation was after Pakistan's independence in 1947 when the Muslim League Chief Minister Abdul Qayyum Khan Kashmiri banned the movement and launched a brutal crackdown on its members, which culminated in the Babra massacre. At its peak, the KK movement consisted of almost 100,000 members.

== Genesis ==
Initially, the movement focussed on social reform as a means of improving the status of Pashtuns in British India. Ghaffar Khan founded several reform movements prior to the formation of the Khudai Khidmatgar, the Anjuman-e Islah ul-Afghan in 1921, the farmers' organisation Anjuman-e Zamidaran in 1927 and the youth movement Pashtun Jirga in 1927. Trying to further spread awareness on Pashtun issues Abdul Ghaffar Khan founded the magazine Pakhtun in May 1928. Finally in March 1930, almost on the eve of the Qissa Khwani Massacre the Khudai Khidmatgar were formed.

== "The Red Shirts" ==
Khan drew his first recruits from the young men who had graduated from his schools. Trained and uniformed, they served behind their officers and filed out into various villages to seek recruits. They began by wearing a simple white overshirt, but the white was soon dirtied. A couple of men had their shirts dyed at the local tannery, and the brick-red colour proved a breakthrough, it was this distinctive colour that earned the Khudai khidmatgar movement activists the name "the Red shirts" or surkh posh. Other reason for the choice of red color was a symbolic adherence of the anti-colonial movements to the revolutionary and socialist discourse.

=== Structure ===
Volunteers who took the oath formed platoons with commanding officers and learned basic army discipline. The volunteers had their own flags: red in the beginning, later tri-colour and bands: bagpipe and drums. The men wore red uniforms and the women black. They had drills, badges, a flag, the entire military hierarchy of rank and even a bagpipe corps.

Khan set up a network of committees called jirgas, named and modelled after the traditional tribal councils. Villages were grouped into larger groups, responsible to district-wide committees. The Provincial Jirgah was the ultimate authority.

Officers in the ranks were not elected, since Khan wanted to avoid infighting. He appointed a salar-e-azam or commander-in-chief, who in turn appointed officers to serve under him. Other ranks included Jarnails (Generals). The army was completely voluntary; even the officers gave their services free. Women were recruited too and played an important role in the struggles to come.

Volunteers went to the villages and opened schools, helped on work projects, and maintained order at public gatherings. From time to time they drilled in work camps and took long military-style marches into the hills.

=== Ideology ===
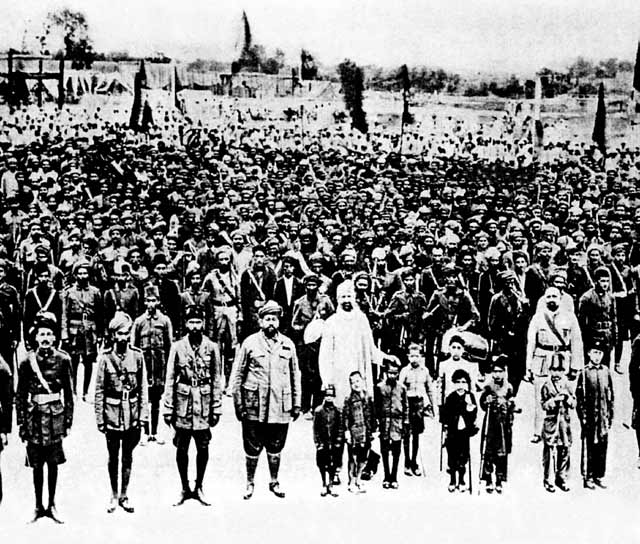
Khudai Khidmatgar

Under the influence of Abdul Ghaffar Khan the movement advocated non-violent protests and justified their actions through an Islamic context. Khan did not find Islam and non-violence as incompatible. Despite that the movement was intrinsically non-sectarian, including Muslims, as well as some Hindu members. In more than one occasion when Hindus and Sikhs were attacked in Peshawar, Khidmatgar members helped protect their lives and property. To this end, the Khuda Khidmatgar espoused Hindu-Muslim unity.

"The Holy Prophet Mohammed came into this world and taught us 'That man is a Muslim who never hurts anyone by word or deed, but who works for the benefit and happiness of God's creatures.' Belief in God is to love one's, fellow men". – Khan Abdul Ghaffar Khan

"There is nothing surprising in a Muslim or a Pathan like me subscribing to the creed of nonviolence. It is not a new creed. It was followed fourteen hundred years ago by the Prophet all the time he was in Mecca". – Khan Abdul Ghaffar Khan

=== Pledge of the Khudai Khidmatgar ===
Example 1

- In the name of God who is Present and Evident, I am a Khudai Khitmatgar.
- I will serve the nation without any self-interest.
- I will not take revenge (badla) and my actions will not be a burden for anyone.
- My actions will be non-violent.
- I will make every sacrifice required of me to stay on this path.
- I will serve people without regard to their religion or faith.
- I shall use nation-made goods.
- I shall not be tempted by any office.

Example 2

In the presence of God, I solemnly affirm that:

1. I hereby honestly and sincerely offer myself for enrollment as a Khudai Khitmatgar.
2. I shall be ever ready to sacrifice personal comfort, property, and even life itself to serve the nation and for the attainment of my country's freedom.
3. I shall not participate in factions, nor pick up a quarrel with or bear enmity towards anybody. I shall always protect the oppressed against the tyranny of the oppressor.
4. I shall not become a member of any other organization, and shall not furnish security or tender apology in the course of a non-violent fight.
5. I shall always obey every legitimate order of my superior officers.
6. I shall always live up to the principles of non-violence.
7. I shall serve all humanity equally. The chief objects of my life shall be the attainment of complete independence and religious freedom.
8. I shall always observe truth and parity in all my actions.
9. I shall expect no remuneration for my service.
10. All my services shall be dedicated to God, they shall not be for attaining rank or for show.

=== The Oath of the Khudai Khidmatgar ===
- I am a Servant of God, and as God needs no service, serving His creation is serving Him,
- I promise to serve humanity in the name of God.
- I promise to refrain from violence and from taking revenge.
- I promise to forgive those who oppress me or treat me with cruelty.
- I promise to refrain from taking part in feuds and quarrels and from creating enmity.
- I promise to treat every Pasthun as my brother and friend.
- I promise to refrain from antisocial customs and practices.
- I promise to live a simple life, to practice virtue, and to refrain from evil.
- I promise to practice good manners and good behavior and not to lead a life of idleness.
- I promise to devote at least two hours a day to social work.
- I put forth my name in honesty and truthfulness to become a true Servant of God.
- I will sacrifice my wealth, life, and comfort for the liberty of my nation and people.
- I will never be a party to factions, hatred, or jealousies with my people; and will side with the oppressed against the oppressor.
- I will not become a member of any other rival organization, nor will I stand in an army.
- I will faithfully obey all legitimate orders of all my officers all the time.
- I will live in accordance with the principles of nonviolence.
- I will serve all God's creatures alike; and my object shall be the attainment of the freedom of my country and my religion.
- I will always see to it that I do what is right and good.
- I will never desire any reward whatever for my service.
- All my efforts shall be to please God, and not for any show or gain.

=== Anthem of Khudai Khidmatgar ===
We are the army of God
By death or wealth unmoved,
We march, our leader and we,
Ready to die!

In the name of God, we march
And in his name, We die
We serve in the name of God
God's servant are we!

God is our king,
And great is he,
We serve our Lord,
His slaves are we!

Our country's cause
We serve with our breath,
For such an end,
Glorious is death

We serve and we love
Our people and our cause
Freedom is our aim,
And our lives are its price.

We love our country
And respect our country
Zealously we protect it
For the glory of God

By cannon or gun undismayed
Soldiers and horsemen,
None can come between,
Our work and our duty.

== British tactics against the Khudai Khidmatgar ==
The British employed a wide variety of tactics against KK activists.

"The British used to torture us, throw us into ponds in wintertime, shave our beards, but even then Badshah Khan told his followers not to lose patience. He said 'there is an answer to violence, which is more violence. But nothing can conquer nonviolence. You cannot kill it. It keeps standing up.' The British sent their horses and cars to run over us, but I took my shawl in my mouth to keep from screaming. We were human beings, but we should not cry or express in any way that we were injured or weak." – KK activist, Musharraf Din.

Another tactic employed against non-violent protesters who were blocking roads was to charge them with cars and horses.

In 1930, soldiers of the Garhwal Rifles refused to fire on non-violent protests led by Khudai Khidmatgars in Peshawar. By disobeying direct orders, the regiment sent a clear message to the colonial government that loyalty of India's armed forces could not be taken for granted when enacting repressive measures. However, by 1931, 5,000 members of the Khudai Khidmatgar and 2,000 members of the Congress Party were arrested. This was followed by the shooting of unarmed protestors in Utmanzai and the Takkar Massacre followed by the Hathikhel massacre.

In 1932, the Khudai Khidmatgar movement changed its tactics and involved women in the movement. This unnerved many Indian officers working in the region as in those days of conservative India it was considered a grave insult to attack women, more so in a conservative Pashtun society. However, the severity of the repressions increased and in one case five police officers in Benares had to be suspended due to "horrific reports about violence used against young female volunteers".

Another tactic employed against Khudai Khadmatgar activists included lacing their morning tea with croton oil, a powerful laxative. When the Khudai Khidmatgar staged a rally in 1942, this tactic was used. During the rally, Khudai Khidmatgar activists "were seen breaking ranks and running helter skelter to relieve themselves on the banks of the [Peshawar] canal... to a proud Pathan, known for cleanliness, it [was] the ultimate disgrace. This spectacle, watched by large crowds of Peshawar citizens, was the peak of humiliation" for the Khudai Khidmatgar.

After the anti-war resignation of Dr Khan's Ministry in 1939 because of the outbreak of the Second World War, British tactics towards the movement changed to a large-scale distribution of pro-colonial propaganda.

== Relationship with the Congress Party ==
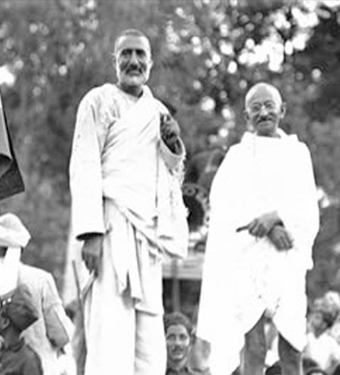
Ghaffar Khan & Gandhi

The movement was facing intense pressure by 1930 and the leadership under Ghaffar Khan was actively seeking political allies in India to help reduce the pressure being placed on it by the British colonial authorities. Previously in December 1928, Barrister Jan Mohammad Abbasi invited Bacha Khan to attend a Khilafat conference. The session ended badly with Maulana Shaukat Ali nearly being attacked by one member from Punjab.

Despite the initial closeness between Ghaffar Khan and Ali, the harshness of their critique of Gandhi contrasted poorly with the patience shown by Gandhi in Ghaffar Khan's eyes. Another attempt was made by senior KK leaders to approach Sir Fazli Hussain a senior Punjabi leader of the Unionist party pleading for assistance against the crackdown which was dismissed.

The Congress subsequently offered all possible help to the Pathans in exchange on their part to join the Congress party for the independence struggle. This offer was put forth in the Frontier province and was accepted by the Khudai Kidmatgars in August 1931. The move shocked the British colonial authorities who were forced to ease pressure on the KK.

== From mass movement to political party ==
More, with the introduction of provincial autonomy under the Government of India Act 1935, the first limited election were held in NWFP in 1936. Ghaffar Khan was banned from the province. His brother, Dr Khan Sahib, led the party to a narrow victory and became Chief Minister. Ghaffar Khan returned to Peshawar in triumph on 29 August 1937 on what the Peshawar daily Khyber Mail called the happiest day of his life. During the two-year stint of the Congress party under Dr Khan Sahib as Chief minister, major reforms were introduced including land reforms, promotion of the teaching of Pashto and the release of political prisoners.

On Congress directive, the ministries in eight out of eleven provinces resigned in protest against Britain's not promising India independence after the War. The decision to resign proved a pivotal moment in Indian history, in the Frontier, it was instrumental in giving those groups that opposed the Khudai Khidmatgar movement the opportunity to broaden their constituency.

=== Escape of Subhash Chandra Bose ===
The KK's activists role in helping Subhash Chandra Bose's escape in 1943 has largely been ignored until recently. In 1941, Amir Khan Khattak along with four other people received Subhash Chandra Bose at Nowshera Railway Station. He had come to make his escape to Nazi Germany via Afghanistan. Disguised as a Muslim, Subhash was taken to Khattak's village Dak Ismailkhel on the request of Mian Akbar Shah from Faqir Chand's house in Peshawar. He stayed with him for two days before leaving in a Pashtun attire for the German Embassy in Kabul leading to his journey to Germany and finally Japan. Agha Haider Ali of the Afghan National bank, helped Bose get in touch with the Kabul authorities and with his travel plans.

== Conservative backlash ==
The increasingly liberal movement faced an increasing backlash from conservatives because of its support for the Congress party amidst growing support for the Pakistan movement. The decision of Dr. Khan Sahib to support his daughter's marriage to a Sikh soldier led to some senior associates of Bacha Khan to leave.

Similarly, his son Ghani Khan's criticism of feudal landlords angered many conservative "Khans" and Nawabs, some formerly sympathetic to the movement.

This coincided with a determined effort by the colonial government to discredit the movement with the assistance of pro-British mullahs and ulema. The British Governor, Cunningham, instructed the big khans to meet each mullah on an individual basis and tell him to serve the cause of Islam' for which he would be duly paid. The Mullahs were told that in case of good progress they would also be considered for a government pension. A Cunningham policy note of 23 September 1942 reads: 'Continuously preach the danger to Muslims of connivance with the revolutionary Hindu body. Most tribesmen seem to respond to this', while in another paper he says about the period 1939–43: 'Our propaganda since the beginning of the war had been most successful. It had played throughout on the Islamic theme.

== Post-partition Downfall ==
Pakistan's Independence in August 1947 marked the beginning of the end of the Khudai Khidmatgar movement. While the Congress government remained in power briefly it was eventually dismissed by the Governor under the orders of Pakistan's founder Muhammad Ali Jinnah. Dr. Khan Sahib was replaced by former Congressite Abdul Qayyum Khan Kashmiri. He successfully stopped an attempted rapprochement between Ghaffar Khan and Muhammad Ali Jinnah by stopping a planned meeting between the two citing security threats. With that, Jinnah gave Qayyum Khan Kashmiri a free hand in dealing with the Congress and the Khudai Khidmatgars.

Despite the provocation and its obvious ambivalence over Pakistan's creation, the Khudai Khidmatgar leaders reconvened at Sardaryab on 3 and 4 September 1947 and passed a resolution that stated, "The Khudai Khidmagars regard Pakistan as their own country and pledge that they shall do their utmost to strengthen and safeguard its interest and make every sacrifice for the cause; The dismissal of Dr. Khan Sahib’s ministry and the setting up of Abdul Qaiyum’s ministry is undemocratic, but as our country is passing through a critical stage, the Khudai Khidmatgars shall take no step which might create difficulties in the way of either the Provincial or Central Government; After the division of the country the Khudai Khidmatgars sever their connection with the All-India Congress organization and, therefore, instead of the Tricolor, adopt the Red Flag as the symbol of their party."

You have thrown us (Khudai Khidmatgar) to the wolves.

— Bacha Khan addressing the Mahatma after Partition of India.

However, Qayyum Khan Kashmiri and the central government had already decided that there would be no accord with the movement. On 12 August 1948, while Bacha Khan and the deposed chief minister Dr. Khan Sahib were both under arrest, over 600 Khudai Khidmatgar supporters who were protesting for their release were killed by the government of Pakistan in Charsadda District during the Babrra massacre. The Khudai Khidmatgar organisation was declared unlawful in mid-September 1948, mass arrests followed and the centre at Sardaryab (Markaz-e-Khudai Khidmatgaran), built-in 1942, was destroyed by the Provincial Government.

The movement was also hit by defections as party members switched sides out of fear or for benefit. Those members that wished to survive politically rallied behind a former ally, turned opponent of Qayyum Khan Kashmiri, the Pir of Manki Sharif. The Pir created a breakaway Muslim League, however, it proved no match for Qayyum who engineered his re-election in 1951.

Bacha Khan when took an oath of allegiance to Pakistan in 1948 in legislation assembly and during his speech he was asked by PM Liaquat Ali Khan about Pashtunistan to which he replied that it's just a name to the Pashtun province in Pakistan same like Punjab, Bengal, Sindh and Baluchishtan are the names of provinces of Pakistan as ethno-linguistic names, contrary to what he believed and strived for Pashtunistan an independent state. During the 1950s to the late 1960s, Pashtuns were promoted to higher positions within the Pakistani government and military, thereby integrating Pashtuns into the Pakistani state and severely weakening secessionist sentiments to the point that by the mid-1960s, popular support for an independent Pashtunistan had all but disappeared.

An important development in Pakistan during the Ayub period (1958–1969) was the gradual integration into Pakistani society and the military-bureaucratic establishment. It was a period of Pakistan's political history which saw a large number of ethnic Pashtuns holding high positions in the military and the bureaucracy. Ayub himself was a non-Pashto speaking ethnic Pashtun belonging to the Tarin sub-tribe of the Hazara District in the Frontier. The growing participation of Pashtuns in the Pakistani Government resulted in the erosion of the support for the Pashtunistan movement in the Province by the end of the 1960s.

— Rizwan Hussain, 2005

The movement lingered on till 1955, when it was again banned by the central government because of Ghaffar Khan's opposition to the One Unit. An aborted attempt was made to bring Ghaffar Khan into the government as a minister as well as turning the KK movement into a national organization, but Ghaffar Khan turned down the offer.

Although the ban on the movement was lifted in 1972, the Khudai Khidmatgar movement had been broken.

On 20 January 2011, young Gandhian activist Faisal Khan revived the Khudai Khidmatgar at a function in the Indian city of Delhi, with a focus on promoting communal amity and ameliorating poverty. The Khudai Khidmatgar has volunteers in 14 states and according to Faisal, they number about 10,000. Though the present organisation is predominantly Muslim, 10 of 40 seats in its national executive committee are reserved for Hindu members.

== Reception ==
The Khudai Khidmatgar movement was a success in the terms of its opposition to British colonial rule. However, the social effects of the movement have not survived. While the Ghaffar Khan family maintains a hold over the political philosophy of the movement, its history has largely been wiped out from official memory in Pakistan. The movement has also been criticized for its opposition to partition and by that virtue the creation of Pakistan.

As a result, it has been seen as a secessionist movement in Pakistan, and in the 1950s and 1960s, it was also perceived as pro-communist, an argument that was used by conservative elements to discredit it as anti-Islam. The movement's claim to total non-violence seems flawed as well; some critics argue that while the movement proved successful against the British, it like other non-violent movements would not have proved a success against the Pakistani state. This is supposedly proved by its failure to pose a challenge to the Pakistani government. Others have also suggested that the Khudai Khidmatgar movement was not in fact as non-violent as its supporters would argue. Writers like Schofield and Bannerjee have documented cases of attacks on British colonial officials by Khudai Khidmatgar members.

== See also ==
- Abdul Ghaffar Khan
- All India Pakhtoon Jirga-e-Hind
- Composite nationalism
- Faqir of Ipi
- Frontier Crimes Regulation
- Khilafat Movement
- Aimal Wali Khan
- List of peace activists
- Khan Roshan Khan
- National Awami Party
- Nonviolent Soldier of Islam (book)
- Qazi Ataullah Khan
- Sahibzada Abdul Qayyum (not to be confused with Abdul Qayyum Khan Kashmiri)
- Pakistan

== Notes ==
- Baldauf, Scott. "The Khudai Khidmatgar". Christian Science Monitor. Archived from the original on 26 June 2006.
- Banerjee, Mukulika (2000). Pathan Unarmed: Opposition & Memory in the North-West Frontier. School of American Research Press. ISBN 0-933452-68-3
- Eknath Easwaran (1999). Nonviolent soldier of Islam: Ghaffar Khan: a man to match his mountains (see article). Nilgiri Press, Tomales, CA. ISBN 1-888314-00-1
- Khan, Behroz (July 2004) Journey in history. The NEWS. Jang group. Available online at
- Rashid, Haroonur (2005) History of the Pathans. Volume 2 p 573
- Taizi, Sher Zaman. (2002) Bacha Khan in Afghanistan: A Memoir. Asian Reflection.
- Babar, Aneela, (29 May 2006) On Doing Pakhtunwali. The Post.
- Khan, Abdul K. 1997. "The Khudai Kidmatgar (Servants of God)/Red Shirt Movement in the Northwest Frontier Province of British India, 1927–47." PhD. Diss., History. The University of Hawaii.
- Michel, Thomas S.J. (June 2004) Can’t We Be Like Abdul Ghaffar Khan? The significance of Abdul Ghaffar Khan in the recent history of peace activism is his institution of the importance of discipline in peacemakers.
- Talbot, Ian(1 March 1989)Provincial Politics and the Pakistan Movement: The Growth of the Muslim League in North-West and North-East India 1937–47
