= Vellalur =

Neighbourhood in Madurai district, Tamil Nadu, India

Vellalur Vellalur Nadu
- village
- Country: India
- State: Tamil Nadu
- District: Madurai

Area
  - Total: 2 km^{2} (0.77 sq mi)

Population (2011)
  - Total: 8,000 (approx.)
  - Density: 4,000/km^{2} (10,000/sq mi)

Languages
  - Official: Tamil
- Time zone: UTC+5:30 (IST)
- PIN: 625109
- Telephone code: 91 452
- Vehicle registration: TN 59

Vellalur is a Tamil cultural village located in Melur Taluk in Madurai District in the Indian state of Tamil Nadu.

Vellalur is 8.3 km from Melur, the Taluk main town; 32.1 km from Madurai East, the district's main city; 395 km from Chennai, the state's main city; and 18 km from Sivagangai.

Sub-villages in Vellalur include Pulimalaipatti, Kattasolaipatti, Mandramalaipatti, Melavalasai, Vellanayagampatti, Idayavalasai, Mattangipatti and Edaiyarkovilpatti. Nearby temples include Karungal Swami, Manthakk Kovil, Karpaga Vinayakar, Vallidikaar, and Chinna Elai Kaatha Amman Temple. Periya Elai Kaatha Amman Temple is situated 5 km away.

A two-week festival for Elai Kaatha Amman Temple is celebrated yearly starting on the last week of September. A government primary health center is located in the village. The center provides general medical services 24 hours-per-day and has a siddha medicine department. Sports clubs include various cricket clubs.

== Vellaloor Massacre, 1767 ==
Vellaloor Massacre, 1767, is the killing of nearly 5000 men of the Kallan clan at the Vellalore village near Melur Taluk in Madurai District in the Indian state of Tamil Nadu. The massacre was ordered by Captain Rumley of the East India Company. The murder of the Indigenous people occurred, as they refused to pay taxes to the East India Company. The carnage is recorded in the 1767 annual gazette of the Madras Government.

The Kallars had been resisting paying taxes to the Company, and five battalions of sepoys and 1,500 cavalry under Captain Rumley were sent to extract taxes. The villages held defensive positions, and refused to pay the taxes. Captain Rumley ordered the village to be set on fire, and anyone escaping the fire (men, women and children) were killed by the Company sepoys. This resulted in more than 3000 being killed at Vellalapatti. This incident made other surrounding villages submit to the Company and pay their taxes.

After, a while, there was another instance of rebellion by the Kallar, by attacks on the Company peons, which was followed by another massacre by Captain Rumley, resulting in the death of another 2000 people.
