= Takkar (Mardan District) =

Coordinates: 34°17′18″N 71°53′50″E

- Village and union council
- Interactive map of Takkar
- Country: Pakistan
- Province: Khyber Pakhtunkhwa
- District: Mardan District
- Time zone: UTC+5 (PST)
- Postal code: 23160
- Area code: 0937

Takkar is a village and union council of Mardan District in Khyber Pakhtunkhwa province of Pakistan. It is located at 34°17′18N 71°53′50E and has an altitude of 338 metres (1,109 ft).

== See also ==
- Takkar massacre
