= Sirajganj-4 =

Constituency of Bangladesh's Jatiya Sangsad

- Constituency for the Jatiya Sangsad
- District: Sirajganj District
- Division: Rajshahi Division
- Electorate: 391,114 (2018)

Current constituency
- Created: 1984
- Party: Bangladesh Jamaat-e-Islami
- Member: Rafiqul Islam Khan
- ← 64 Sirajganj-3 66 Sirajganj-5 →

Sirajganj-4 is a constituency represented in the Jatiya Sangsad (National Parliament) of Bangladesh since 2026 by Rafiqul Islam Khan of the Bangladesh Jamaat-e-Islami.

== Boundaries ==
Sirajganj-4 constituency consists of Ullapara Upazila of Sirajganj district.

== Members of Parliament ==
Election	Member	Party
7 March 1973	Abdur Rashid Tarkabagish	Awami League
18 February 1979	Abdul Latif Mirza	Jatiya Samajtantrik Dal
7 May 1986	Abdul Latif Mirza	Awami League
3 March 1988	Abdul Hamid Talukder	Jatiya Party
27 February 1991	M Akbar Ali	Bangladesh Nationalist Party
15 February 1996	Shamsul Alam	Independent
12 June 1996	Abdul Latif Mirza	Awami League
1 October 2001	M Akbar Ali	Bangladesh Nationalist Party
29 December 2008	Md. Shafiqul Islam	Awami League
5 January 2014	Tanveer Imam	Awami League
30 December 2018	Tanveer Imam	Awami League
7 January 2024	Md. Shafiqul Islam	Awami League
12 February 2026	Rafiqul Islam Khan	Bangladesh Jamaat-e-Islami

== Elections ==
=== Elections in the 2020s ===
General Election 2026: Sirajganj-4
Party	Candidate	Votes	%	±%
Jamaat	Rafiqul Islam Khan	161,872		
BNP	M.Akbar Ali	161,278		
IAB	Abdur Rahman	2,216		N/A
Majority		594		
Turnout		333,065	70.00	
Jamaat gain from AL				
