= Tanveer Imam =

Bangladeshi politician

- তানভীর ইমাম

Member of Parliament for Sirajganj-4
- In office 29 January 2014 – 30 December 2018
- Preceded by: Md. Shafiqul Islam

Personal details
- Born: 1 January 1960 (age 66) Sirajganj, Pakistan
- Party: Bangladesh Awami League
- Parent: Hossain Toufique Imam (father)

Tanveer Imam (born 1 January 1960), a Bangladesh Awami League politician, was a Jatiya Sangsad member representing the Sirajganj-4 constituency.

== Early life ==
Imam was born on 1 January 1960. His father, Hossain Toufique Imam, was an adviser to Prime Minister Sheikh Hasina.

== Career ==
Imam was elected to parliament in 2014 from Sirajganj-4 as a Bangladesh Awami League candidate.

On 9 September 2017, Imam was injured while getting out of a running train after dropping off his wife in Pakshi Station. Ashim Kumar Talukder, Divisional Railway Manager, suspended the Station Master, Shamsul Alam, and formed a two-member committee to investigate the incident.

In November 2017, Imam criticised the Health and Family Welfare Minister for failing to provide proper healthcare in Bangladesh. After the fall of the Sheikh Hasina led Awami League government, his in-laws house was attacked by a mob. He was detained and assaulted at the Bangabandhu Sheikh Mujib Medical University while in custody.
