= Ullahpara Upazila =

Administrative area in Rajshahi, Bangladesh

Ullapara উল্লাপাড়া
- Upazila of Bangladesh
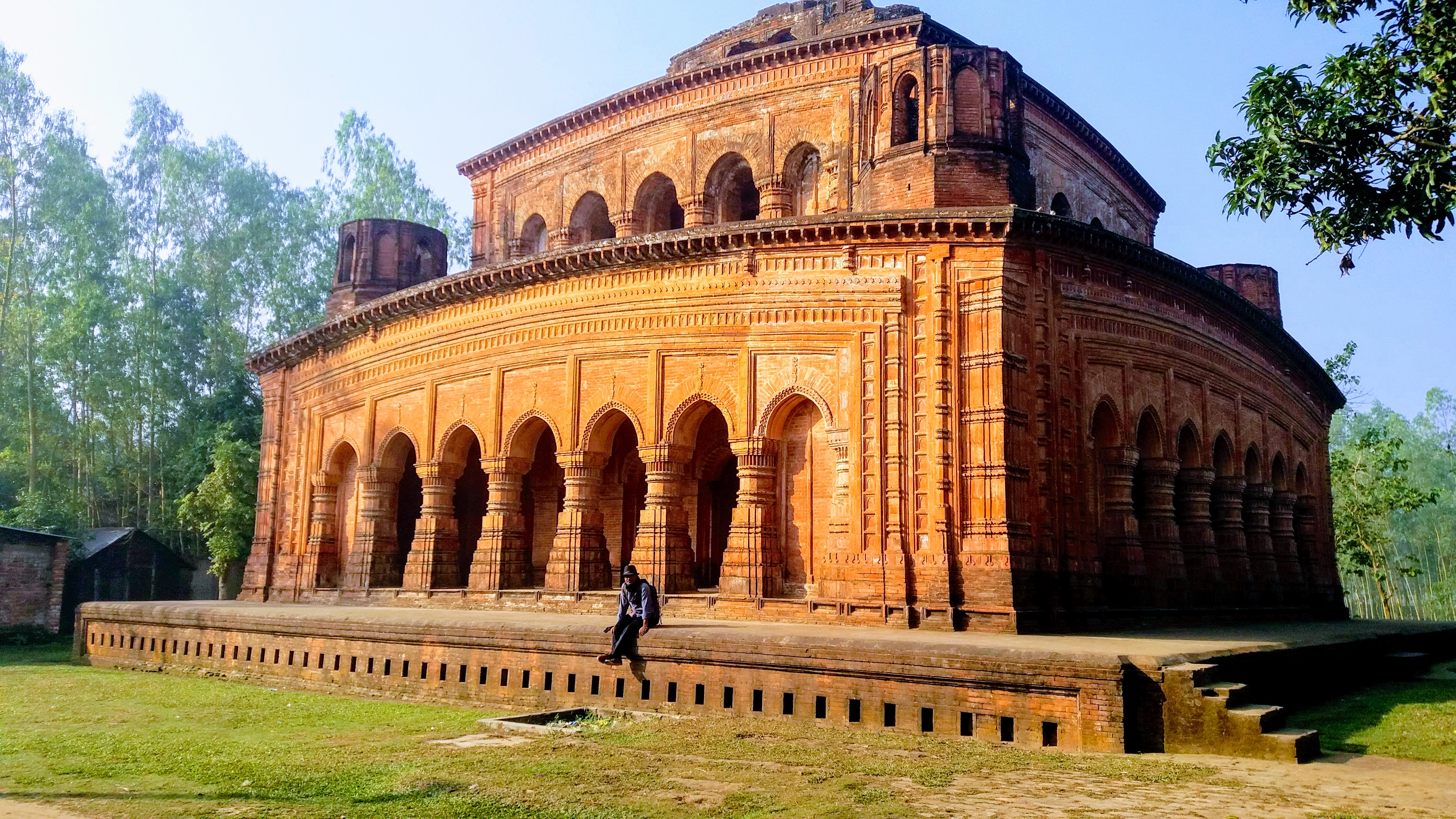
- Navaratna Temple, Ullahpara

- Coordinates: 24°19.2′N 89°34′E
- Country: Bangladesh
- Division: Rajshahi
- District: Sirajganj

Area
  - Total: 409.06 km^{2} (157.94 sq mi)

Population (2022)
  - Total: 589,041
  - Density: 1,440.0/km^{2} (3,729.5/sq mi)
- Time zone: UTC+6 (BST)
- Postal code: 6750
- Area code: 07529
- Website: ullapara.sirajganj.gov.bd

Ullapara (Bengali: উল্লাপাড়া) is an upazila, or sub-district of Sirajganj District, located in Rajshahi Division, Bangladesh.

== History ==
Around 4500 BC, the region of Varendra consisted of parts of Dinajpur, Joypurhat, Bogra, Rajshahi and western Pabna. Pabna and Mymensingh were formed by the deposition of alluvial river soil. At that time, there was no Jamuna River, and Sirajganj and Tangail were part of Mymensingh. According to the Chinese traveler Xuanzang, Sirajgonj was inhabited for seven centuries before the Jamuna began to separate the region from the rest of Mymensingh. At that time, the new region was underwater for eight or nine months of the year. According to Xuanzang, the west bank of the Karatoya River was in the kingdom of Pundravardhana; Ullapara was probably also in the kingdom at the time. The area was settled during the eras of Muslim administration (1204-1757) and the British Raj (1757-1947) before a business center was established. In 1875 a thana (police station) was built, and on 2 July 1983, Ullapara became an upazila.

== Geography ==
Ullapara, with 123,864 households and an area of 409.06 square kilometres (157.94 sq mi), was built on alluvial soil deposited by the Padma, Jamuna and other rivers. The upazilas of Raiganj and Tarash are to the north of Ullapara, Tarash and Bhangura to the west, Faridpur and Shahjadpur to the south and Belkuchi and Kamarkhanda to the east. Ullapara is an estimated 10–12 feet (3.0–3.7 m) above sea level, and is drained by the Karatoya, Fulzor, Jopjopia and Kamla Dargadoh rivers. The average annual high temperature is 35 °C (95 °F) and the average low is 21 °C (70 °F). Annual average rainfall is 170–190 centimetres (67–75 in).

== Demographics ==
Religions in Ullahpara Upazila (2022)
Religion	Percent
Islam	96.31%
Hinduism	3.68%
Other or not stated	0.01%

According to the 2022 Bangladeshi census, Ullapara Upazila had 148,432 households and a population of 589,041. 9.43% of the population were under 5 years of age. Ullapara had a literacy rate (age 7 and over) of 70.01%: 72.81% for males and 67.31% for females, and a sex ratio of 97.38 males for every 100 females. 76,616 (13.01%) lived in urban areas.

According to the 2011 Census of Bangladesh, Ullahpara Upazila had 123,864 households and a population of 540,156. 130,143 (24.09%) were under 10 years of age. Ullahpara had a literacy rate (age 7 and over) of 43.63%, compared to the national average of 51.8%, and a sex ratio of 1004 females per 1000 males. 47,693 (8.83%) lived in urban areas.

According to the 2001 Bangladesh census, Ullahoara has a population of 4,49,243; male constituted 231746, female 217497.

In the 1991 Bangladesh census, Ullapara had a population of 5,40,156. Males were 51.13 percent of the population, and females 48.87 percent. The population aged 18 and older was 192,188. Ullapara had an average literacy rate of 39.61 percent (ages seven and older); males had a 44.81-percent literacy rate and females a 34.09-percent rate, compared to the national average of 82.4 percent.

== Administration ==
Ullahpara Upazila is divided into Ullahpara Municipality and 13 union parishads: Bangala, Barahar, Bara Pangashi, Durganagar, Hatikumrul, Mohanpur, Panchakrushi, Purnimaganti, Ramkrishanpur, Salanga, Salap, Udhunia, and Ullahpara. The union parishads are subdivided into 253 mauzas and 412 villages.

Ullahpara Municipality is subdivided into 9 wards and 25 mahallas. The Upazila divided into two police station. One Ullapara Thana and another being Salanga Thana

== Transport ==
Rivers were formerly the only effective routes of communication. The Dhaka-Rangpur highway and the Dhaka-Rajshahi railway connect the upazila (at the village of Newargacha) with other parts of Bangladesh. A road network exists, and the Bangabandhu Bridge over the Jamuna has reduced the overland travel time to Dhaka to about three hours.

== Education ==
Alipur Amdanga School and College, Ullapara Science College, Government Akbar Ali College, H.T.Imam Girls School and College are renowned colleges. Momena Ali Biggan School, Ullapara Merchent's Pilot School, Salop High School, Ullapara Adarsha High school, Barahar School and College, Panchlia Badrul Alam High School are renowned schools. Ullapara's oldest secondary school, Salop High School (estabd. in 1905), the second oldest Ullapara Merchant's Pilot High English School, was founded in 1906 by the jute merchants of the small river port. Other schools are Kaliakoir Adarsha High School, Ullapara Science College, Government Akbar Ali College Barahar School & College, Barahar Hazi Abbus Ali Alim Madrasha, Barahar Primary School and K.A.M High School. Akbar Ali College, founded in 1970, was the upazila's first college. There are also some schools as Momena Ali Biggan School, Mohonpur KM Institution,[ Pagla Boalia High School Udhunia Manikjan High School, Ullapara Adarsha High School, Kayra High School & College, Kayra Fazil Madrasa, Dadpur High School, Kayra, Kayra Khadiza Saeed High School, and Pukurpar S & B Fazil Madrasha, Panchlia Badrul Alam High School.

== Notable residents ==
- Hossain Toufique Imam, political adviser to Prime Minister Sheikh Hasina, lived in the upazila.
- Tanveer Imam, Member of Parliament, was elected from constituency Sirajganj-4 in 2014.
- Rajendra Lahiri, revolutionary, was born at Mohanpur village in 1892.
- Fateh Lohani, actor and journalist, stood for election to Parliament from Ullapara in 1973.
- Kamal Lohani, journalist, was born in Shantala in 1934.
- Abdul Latif Mirza was the Member of Parliament for constituency Sirajganj-4 from 1996 until 2001.
- Abdur Rashid Tarkabagish, parliamentarian, was born in Tarotia village in 1900.
- Foridul Islam Nirzon, Writer [https://samakal.com/bangladesh/article/221848/%E0%A6%AB%E0%A6%B0%E0%A6%BF%E0%A6%A6%E0%A7%81%E0%A6%B2-%E0%A6%87%E0%A6%B8%E0%A6%B2%E0%A6%BE%E0%A6%AE-%E0%A6%A8%E0%A6%BF%E0%A6%B0%E0%A7%8D%E0%A6%9C%E0%A6%A8%E0%A7%87%E0%A6%B0-%E0%A6%9C%E0%A7%80%E0%A6%AC%E0%A6%A8%E0%A6%AC%E0%A6%BF%E0%A6%B2%E0%A6%BE%E0%A6%B8

== See also ==
- Districts of Bangladesh
- Divisions of Bangladesh
