= Vellaloor massacre =

Massacre

- Location of Vellaloor in Madurai District, India
- Location: 10°0′1.44″N 78°25′58.8″E; Vellalore village, Madras Presidency, British India (present day Vellaloor, Tamil Nadu, India)
- Date: 1 January 1767; 259 years ago (IST)
- Target: Unarmed men, women and children of the Kallar aka mukkullathor kallar clan, who refused to pay the tax imposed by the English East India Company
- Attack type: Massacre
- Deaths: 5000 men, women and children
- Injuries: unknown
- Perpetrator: Captain Rumley of the English East India Company ordered by the Nawab of the Carnatic

The Vellaloor massacre refers to the killing of nearly 5000 people of the Kallar clan at the Vellalore village near Melur Taluk in what is now the Madurai District in the Indian state of Tamil Nadu. The massacre was ordered by the Nawab of the Carnatic to a "Captain Rumley" in charge of his army. The murder of the Indigenous people occurred, as they refused to pay taxes to the Nawab. The carnage is recorded in a 1835 magazine.

"the Nabob sent a detachment, under the command of Captain Rumley, consisting of five battalions of Native infantry and 1,500 cavalry. This force encamped at Maloor; and, after a fortnight, Captain Rumley summoned the Nattaurs. They would not appear; indeed, they continued to manifest their licentious character and contemptuously slighted the detachment. In consequence of this, Captain Rumley marched to Vellaloor naud; and, having caused the village to be surrounded, he required the principal Nattaurs to surrender. But, as the whole of the Colleries persevered and were preparing for hostility, using insulting language and brandishing their weapons within the hedge which surrounded the village, Captain Rumley ordered the hedge to be set on fire. The fire soon communicated to the houses, and the conflagration became general; upon this, in order to save themselves from the flames, the Colleries sallied out, when the troops and cavalry attacked all that ventured out and killed them, without regard to sex or age! It is said that about three thousand men, women, and children were slain on that day!" Alexander's East India and Colonial MagazineJ

Following this ten peons were sent by the Nawab to the area and murdered by the villagers who then burned their village and invaded into neighbouring territory. Captain Rowley ordered the Nawabs troops to the area and killed 2000 of them in the fight.

These events were preceded by several instances of refusal to pay tax to the various rulers. The term Kallan meant to "steal" and they had long resisted any authority. In 1755 Colonel Alexander Heron led an expedition against the Poligar of Kumaravadi, Lackenaig (Lakshmi Naik?), whose Governor Mayana had taken refugee at the temple of Kovilkudi, at Tirumbur Village. Colonel. Heron and Yusuf Khan led the soldiers in burning down the temple. In this incident, an idol revered by the Kallans were removed and held for a ransom of Five Thousand Rupees. The Kallans being unable to pay, the idol was melted down. This act of Colonel. Heron was condemned even by the Madras Council of the East India Company, as an action becoming unworthy of an English officer, and the prejudice that this act will cause among the natives about England.

Indian classical literature, including Tamil Sangam literature have only glorified kings as a norm, and hence this massacre of common people did not find a mention in contemporary literature of that period. However the incident has survived as folklore, and also in official records of the Madras Government.

Later references seem to suggest that Captain Rumley was imprisoned at Arnee, then moved to Seringapatam & murdered by poison in 1783 on the orders of Tipu Sultan during the Second Anglo-Mysore War (1780–1784).
