= M Akbar Ali =

Bangladeshi politician

- এম আকবর আলী

Member of Parliament from Sirajganj-4
- In office 1991 – February 1996
- In office 2001–2006

Personal details
- Party: Bangladesh Nationalist Party

M Akbar Ali is a Bangladesh Nationalist Party politician and a former member of parliament for Sirajganj-4.

== Birth and early life ==
M Akbar Ali was born in Sirajganj District.

== Career ==
M Akbar Ali was elected to parliament from Sirajganj-4 as a Bangladesh Nationalist Party candidate in 1991 and 2001. He was defeated by taking part in the nine parliamentary election.

== See also ==
- Jatiya Sangsad
