= Shahjadpur Upazila =

Shahzadpur শাহজাদপুর
- Upazila of Bangladesh
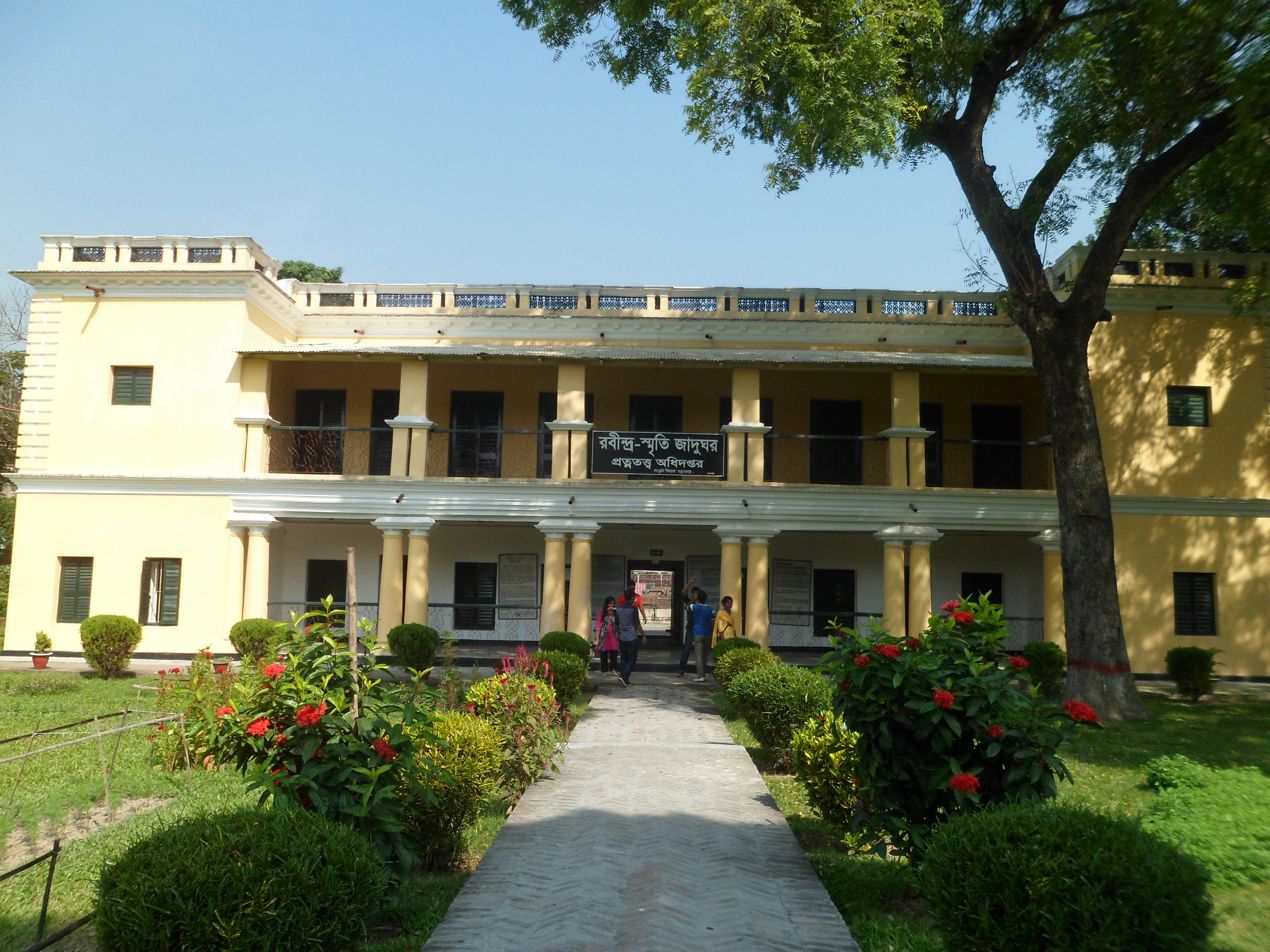
- Shahjadpur Kachharibari

- Coordinates: 24°10.2′N 89°35.3′E
- Country: Bangladesh
- Division: Rajshahi
- District: Sirajganj

Government
  - MP (Sirajganj-6): Merina Jahan
  - Upazila Chairman: Azad Rahman

Area
  - Total: 324.15 km^{2} (125.16 sq mi)

Population (2022)
  - Total: 601,633
  - Density: 1,856.0/km^{2} (4,807.1/sq mi)
- Demonym: Shahzadpuri
- Time zone: UTC+6 (BST)
- Postal code: 6760
- Area code: 07527
- Website: Official Website of Shahjadpur

Shahjadpur Upazila mauza geocode map

Shahjadpur (Bengali: শাহজাদপুর) is an upazila, or sub-district of Sirajganj District, located in Rajshahi Division, Bangladesh.

== History ==
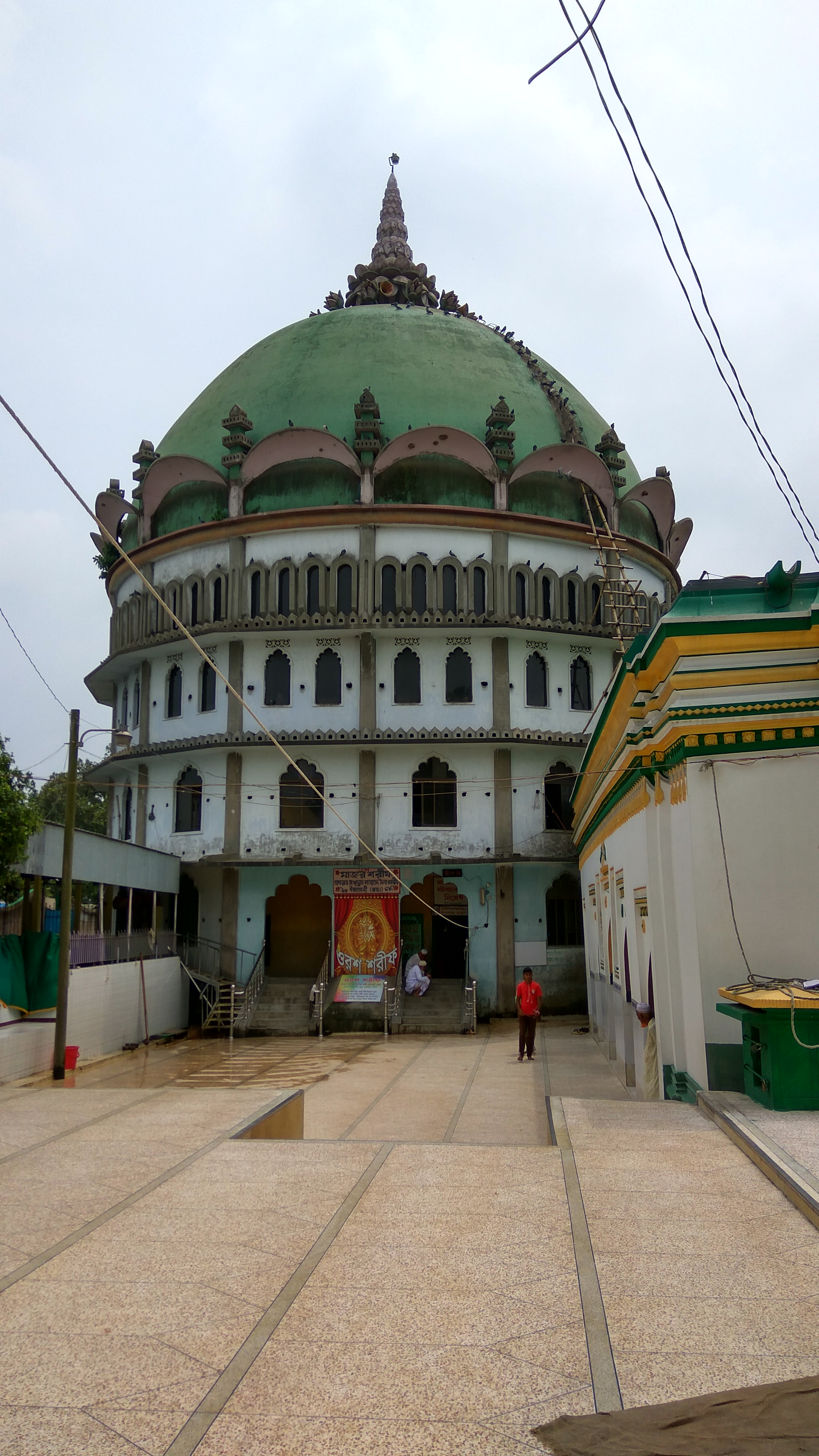
The mazar (mausoleum) of Makhdum Shah Daulah

In c. 1250, a Yemenite Sufi prince known as Makhdum Shah Daulah settled in the area now comprising Shahzadpur, along with his sister, three nephews, twelve disciples and other followers. He is credited for propagating Islam in the region despite the displeasure of the local Hindu raja Vikrama Keshari. Conflict occurred between the two sides in which the prince was executed by Keshari and many of his disciples were martyred. Keshari later repented for his hostility towards the Muslim community and buried their deceased with due solemnity. The area was named as Shahzadpur (city of the prince) in his honour.

Shahzadpur was later included within the Yusufshahi pargana, named after Shah Yusuf. During the Mughal period, Shahzadpur was ruled by the zamindar Raja Ray, who was a member of the Baro-Bhuiyan confederacy, whilst Tuqmaq Khan was appointed as the Mughal jagirdar of Yusufshahi. Raja Ray welcomed Tuqmaq Khan and left his son, Raghu Ray, in the Khan's presence. However, the Raja later rebelled against the Mughal administration, bringing a large fleet to the besiege the Mughal fort for three days. Raja Ray was eventually defeated by the forces of Tuqmaq Khan, and later submitted to the Mughals, fighting on their behalf. His son, Raghu Ray converted to Islam and continued to serve under Tuqmaq Khan. The Subahdar of Bengal Islam Khan I notably celebrated Eid al-Fitr in Shahzadpur.

In 1845, a thana (police headquarters) was established in Shahzadpur by the Company Raj. The area was deeply affected by the Pabna Peasant Uprisings from 1873 to 1876. Under British rule, a munsif court and jailhouse was established in Shahzadpur. Shahzadpur Thana was upgraded to an upazila (sub-district) in 1983 as part of the President of Bangladesh Hussain Muhammad Ershad's decentralisation programme.

== Demographics ==
Religions in Shahjadpur Upazila (2022)
Religion	Percent
Islam	96.85%
Hinduism	3.14%
Other or not stated	0.01%

According to the 2022 Bangladeshi census, Shahjadpur Upazila had 147,529 households and a population of 601,633. 9.52% of the population were under 5 years of age. Shahjadpur had a literacy rate (age 7 and over) of 65.30%: 68.18% for males and 62.43% for females, and a sex ratio of 100.21 males for every 100 females. 106,123 (17.64%) lived in urban areas.

According to the 2011 Census of Bangladesh, Shahjadpur Upazila had 123,576 households and a population of 561,076. 141,933 (25.30%) were under 10 years of age. Shahjadpur had a literacy rate (age 7 and over) of 38.38%, compared to the national average of 51.8%, and a sex ratio of 980 females per 1000 males. 71,367 (12.72%) lived in urban areas.

As of the 1991 Bangladesh census, Shahjadpur has a population of 420452. It has 70998 households and a total area of 324.47 km^{2}. Males constitute 52.05% of the population, and females 47.95%. This Upazila's eighteen up population is 197052. Shahzadpur has an average literacy rate of 24.8% (7+ years), and the national average of 32.4% literate.

== Points of interest ==
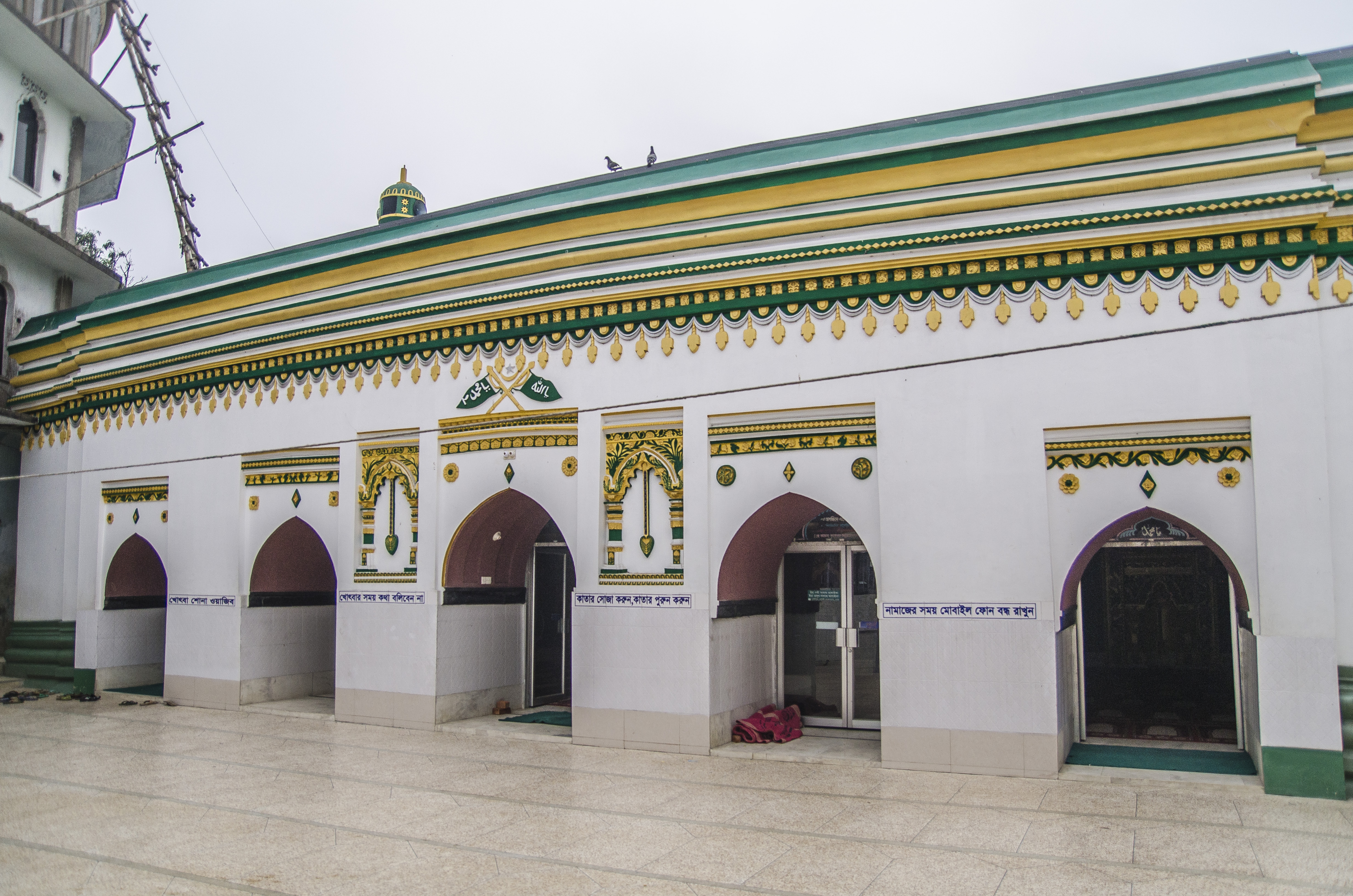
The Shahzadpur Dargah Mosque

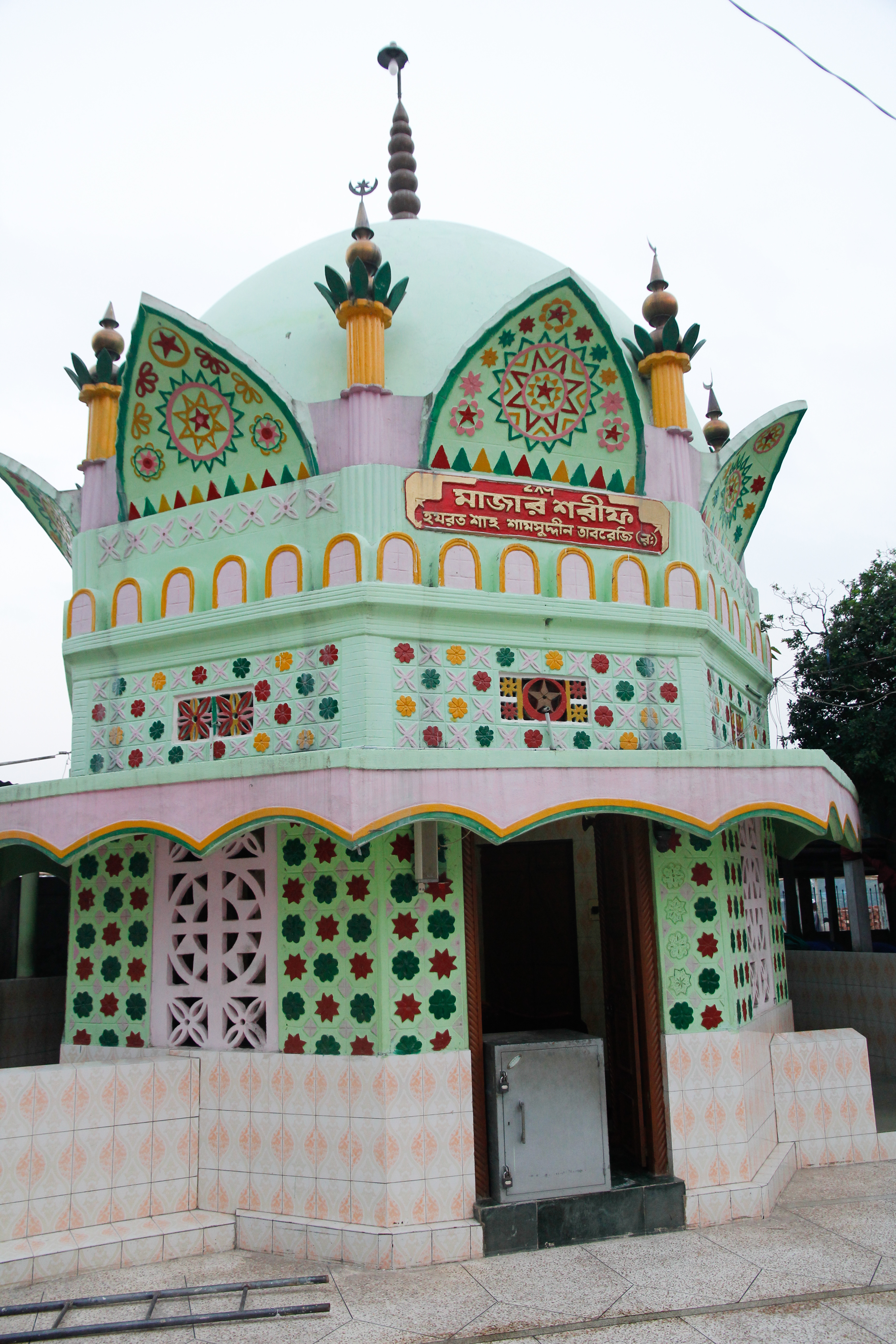
The mazar (mausoleum) of Hazrat Shah Shamsuddin Tabrezi

Shahzadpur is connected with the fond memory of the Nobel-laureate poet Rabindranath Tagore, who used to stay here in connection with administration of his father's zamindary. He wrote a lot of verses while living here. His Kachharibari (revenue office) is still there like the other place, Shilaidaha in Kushtia district.

Another point of interest is Naiem Hasan's House.

== Administration ==
Shahzadpur thana was established in 1845 and was turned into an upazila in 1982. Shahjadpur upazila is represented in the Jatiya Sangsad (National Parliament) of Bangladesh in the name of Sirajganj-6 constituency.

Shahzadpur Upazila is divided into Shahzadpur Municipality which is subdivided into 9 wards and 31 mahallas. The upazila is consist of 13 union parishads: Beltail, Gala, Garadaha, Habibullah Nagar, Jalalpur, Kayempur, Khukni, Narnia, Porjana, Potajia, and Sonatani. The union parishads are subdivided into 155 mauzas and 291 villages.

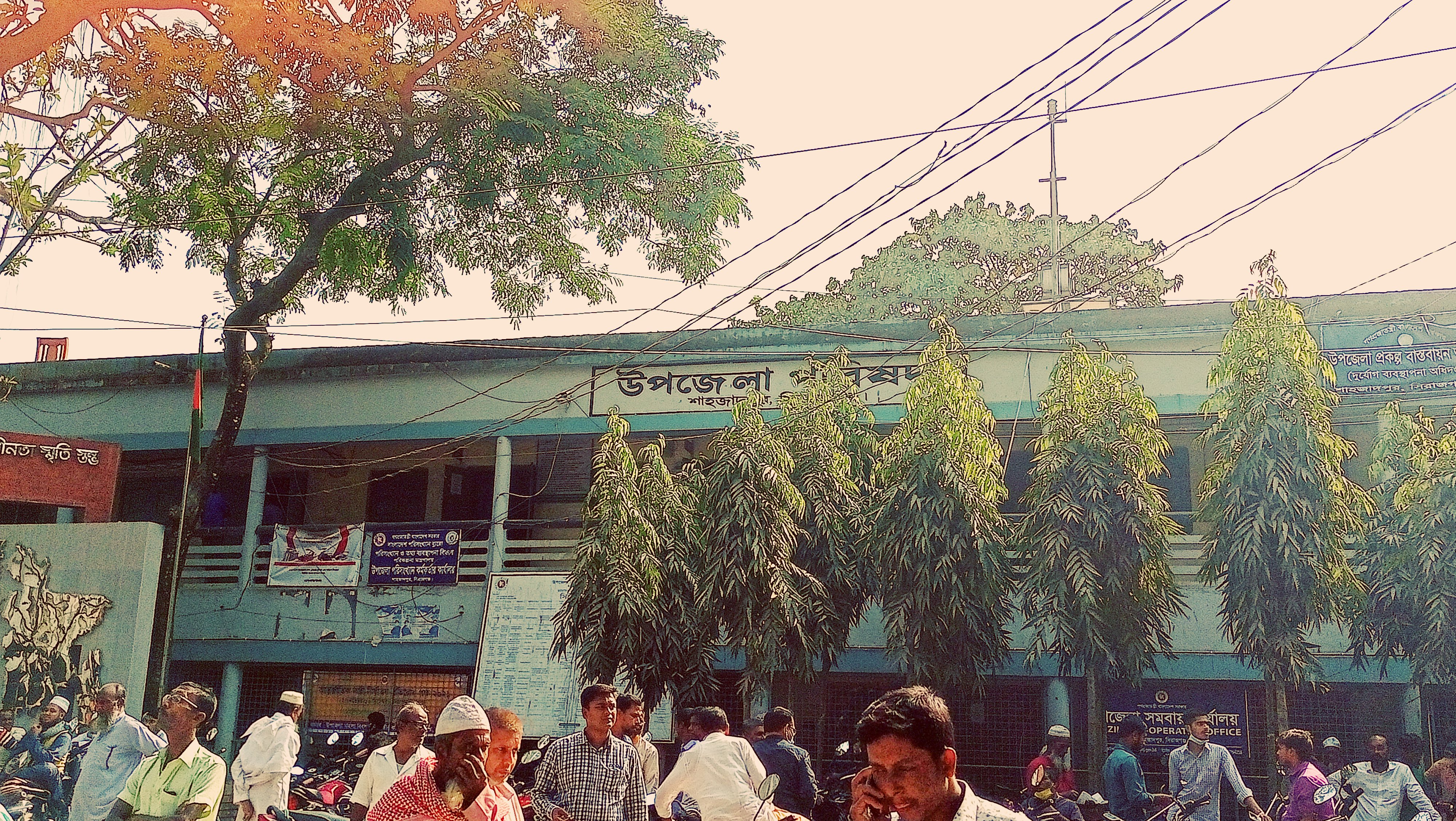
Shahjadpur Upazila Parishad

The area of the town is 19.52km^{2}. The town has a population of 65897; male 51.95% and female 48.05%. The density of population is 3376 per km^{2}. Literacy rate among the town people is 34.5%. The town has one dak bungalow (rest house).

The functions of Shahjadpur Upazila Parishad are regulated by the Upazila Parishad Act, 1998. Organizational structure of Shahjadpur Upazila Parishad consists of one Upazila Parishad Chairman, two Vice Chairmen (one of whom is female) and 13 Union Parishad Chairmen.

Besides, there is an Upazila Nirbahi Officer for conducting administrative activities. There are four branches of upazila administration for conducting functions, these are the Establishment Branch, the Confidential Branch, the Accounts Branch and the Certificates Branch. The various services provided by the upazila administration are fully described in the citizen charter of the upazila administration.

=== Chairmen ===
List of chairmen
Number	Name
01	Muhammad Fazlul Haq
02	Hussain Muhammad Gyadon
03	Hashibur Rahman Swapon
04	Muhammad Azad Rahman

== Education ==
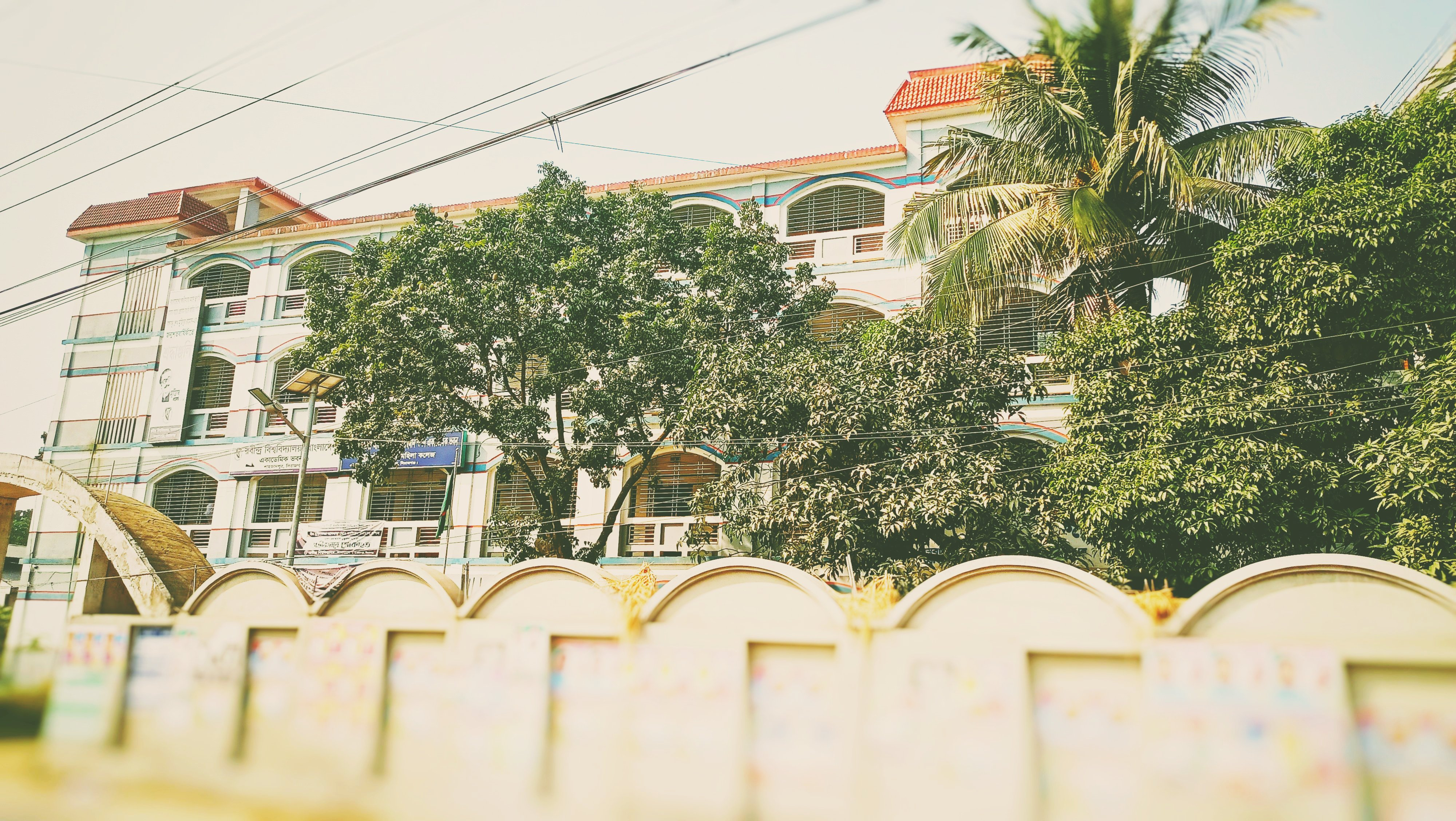
Rabindra University, Bangladesh

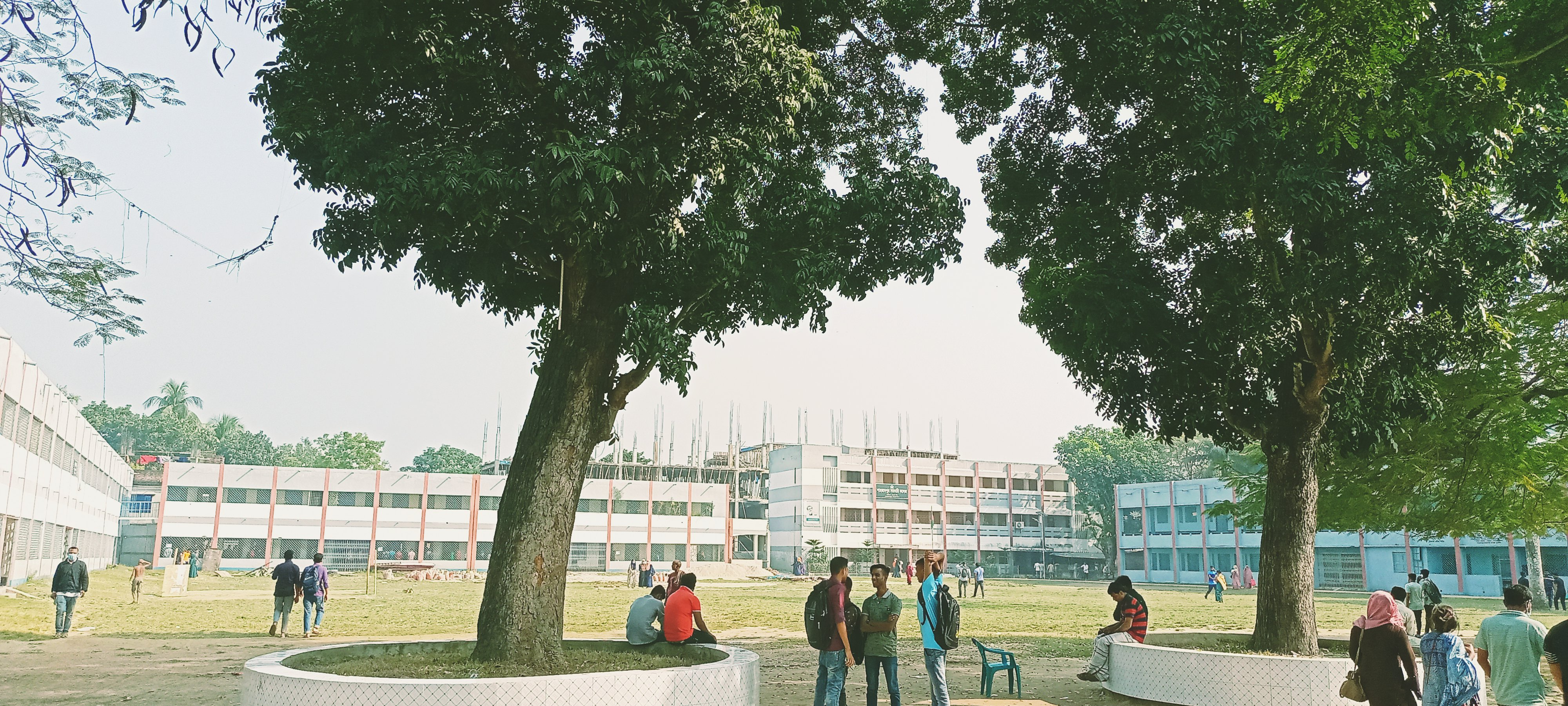
Shahzadpur Government College

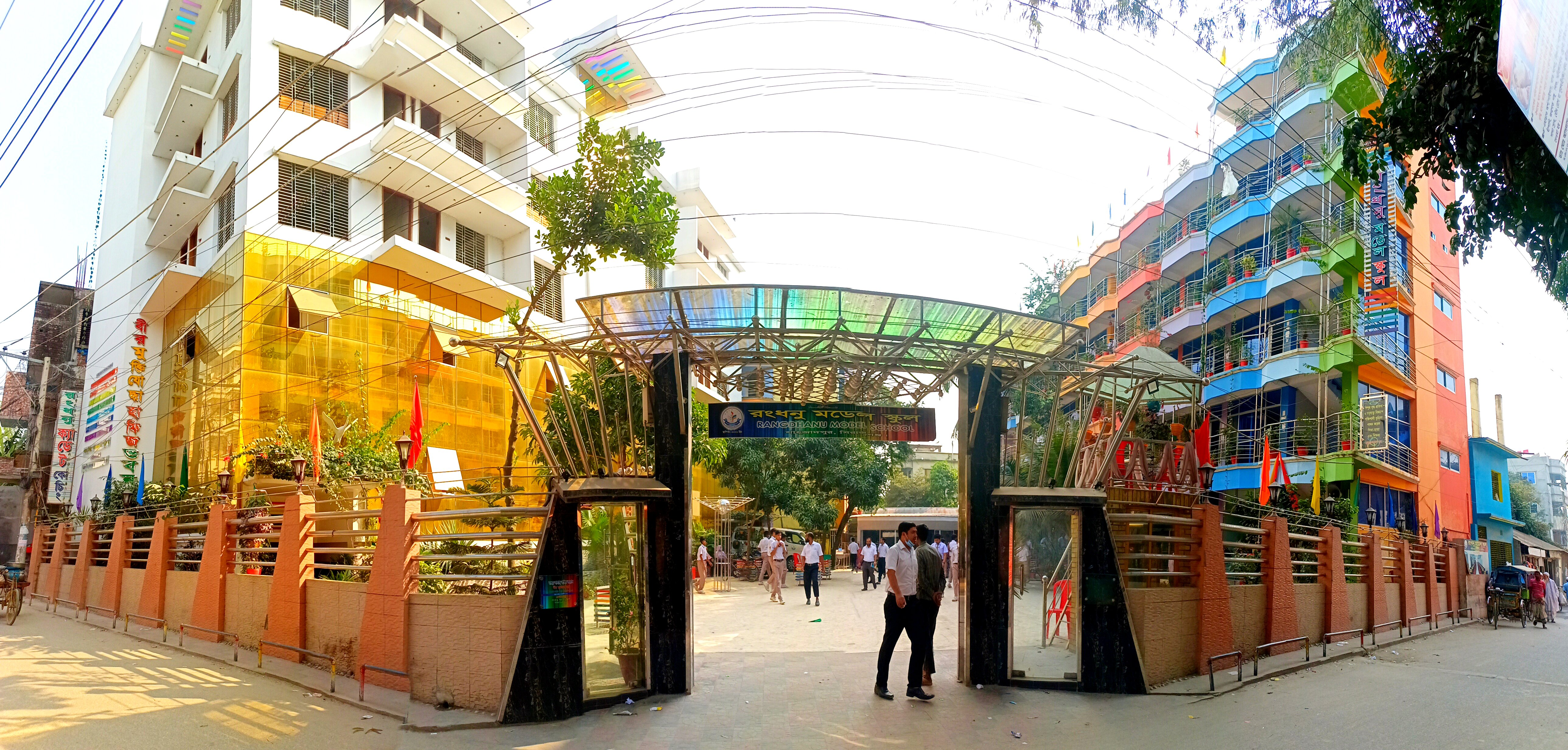
Rangdhanu Model High School

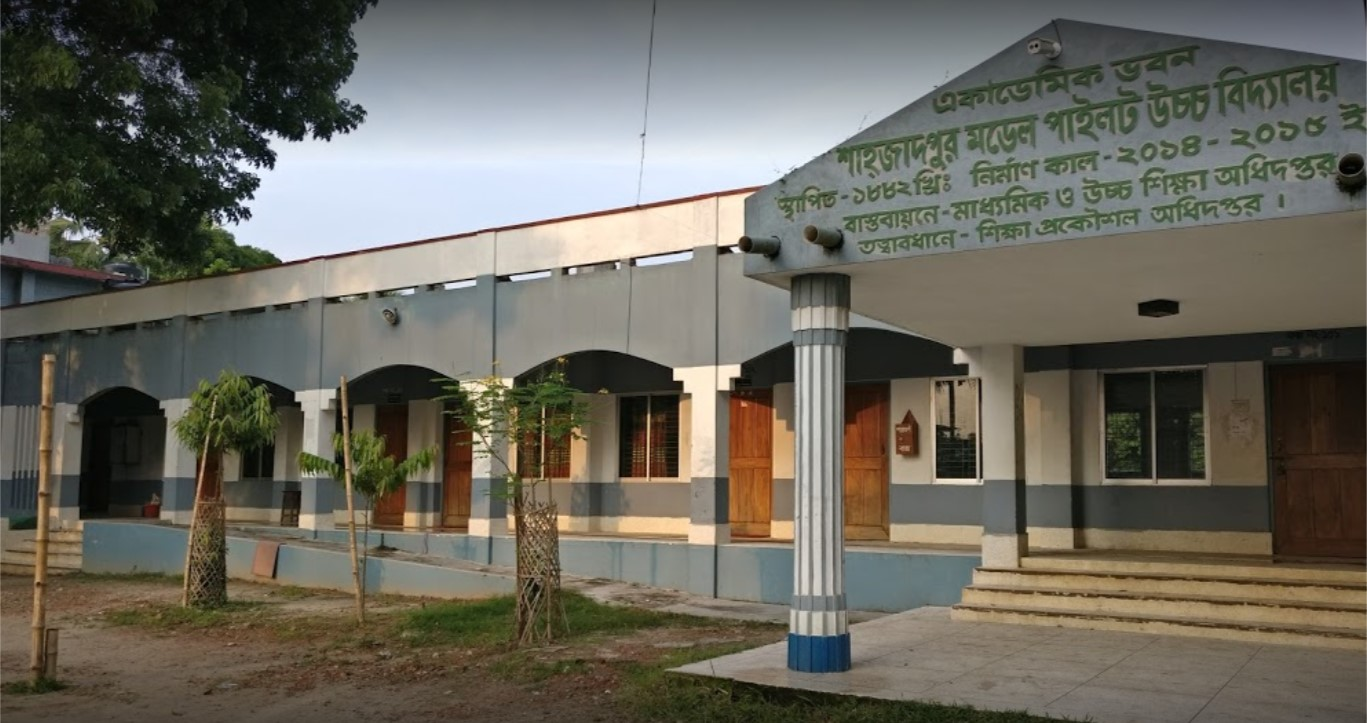
Shahzadpur Government Model Pilot High School

=== University ===
Rabindra University, Bangladesh is the 40th Public University of Bangladesh. This university is established under Rabindra University, Bangladesh Act, 2016. The university, which started its academic activities in 2017, is located in Shahzadpur upazilla. Its permanent campus will be constructed about 7 km west of Shahjadpur upazila town of Sirajganj. At present, educational activities are running on temporary campuses in three colleges of Shahjadpur.

=== Colleges ===
Shahzadpur Government College, Shahzadpur Ibrahim Pilot Girls' High School & College, Shahzadpur Ghorshal Sahitik Barkatullah Degree College Shahzadpur Woman Degree College, Bangabandhu Mohila College, Mawlana Saif Uddin Ahia Degree College, Dugali High School Jamirta Degree College, Satbaria Degree College.

=== Schools ===
Shahzadpur Govt. Model Pilot High School, Udayan Kinder Garten, Charangaru Government Primary School, Muktijoddha Ideal High School Pukurpar, Kironbala Government Primary School, Rangdhunu Model High School, Narina High School Narina Union Dakhil Madrasa, Sonatani High School, Dugli High School, Andher Manik High School, Binotia High School Karshalika Senior Fajil Madrasa, Verakhul Amena Kahtun High School, Jamirta High School Jamirta Primary School Jamirta Juhura Khatun Girls High School Jogtola Primary School East Jogtola Primary School Jogtola Dakhil madrasha Porjona High School Ghorsal Jobayda Barkatullah Dakhil Madrasa Khas Sat Baria High School, Satbaria Primary School Malotidanga East Primary and High School Malotidanga West Primary and High School Talgachi Abu Ishaqe High School Durgadah Primary School Jigarbaria Govt. Primary School Sreefoltala Jobayda Sobahan Girls High School, Daya Govt. Primary School, Daya Junier Girls School, Habibullah Nagor High School, Ag-Nukali Govt Primary School, Ag Nukali West govt primary school, Vennagachi govt primary school, Navaratna Kindergarten, Satbaria and so on.

Outside of these schools, there are a number of NGO-run schools that are also conducting educational activities.

== Notable people ==
- Makhdum Shah Daulah, thirteenth-century Sufi saint
- Mohammed Abdul Matin, former deputy prime minister of Bangladesh
- Mohammad Najibar Rahman, author
- Mazharul Islam, former vice-chancellor of the University of Rajshahi and the first director general of Bangla Academy
- Choyon Islam, politician
- Merina Jahan Kabita, politician
- Kamruddin Ahia Khan Majlish, politician
- Md. Shahjahan, politician
- Abdur Razzak Mukul, freedom fighter and politician
- Hashibur Rahman Swapon, politician
- Syed Hossain Mansur, politician
- Arifur Rahman, political cartoonist
- Uzzal, film actor.
- Afiea Nusrat Barsha, film actress
- Akhi Khatun, footballer
- AKM Mahbubul Islam, politician
- Mohammad Barkatullah (author)

== See also ==
- Shahzadpur tehsil
- Upazilas of Bangladesh
- Districts of Bangladesh
- Divisions of Bangladesh
