= Habibullah Nagar Union =

Habibullah Nagar Union হাবিবুল্লাহ নগর ইউনিয়ন Habibullahnagar Union
- Union Council
- No. 7 Habibullah Nagar Union Council
- Location in Bangladesh
- Country: Bangladesh
- Division: Rajshahi Division
- District: Sirajganj District
- Upazila: Shahzadpur Upazila

Government
  - Chairman: Muhammad Mizanur Rahman Bacchu
  - MP (Sirajganj-6): Mohammad Abdul Muhit

Population
  - Total: 45,140
- Demonym: Habibullahnagari
- Time zone: UTC+6 (BST)
- Website: habibullahnagarup.sirajganj.gov.bd

Habibullah Nagar Union Council (Bengali: হাবিবুল্লাহ নগর ইউনিয়ন পরিষদ) is a Union Parishad under Shahzadpur Upazila of Sirajganj District in the Rajshahi Division of Bangladesh. It has an area of 11.82 square kilometres and a population of 45,140.

== Geography ==
The Habibullah Nagar Union Parishad building is located about 1.5 km east of the Shahzadpur Upazila headquarters, on the eastern bank of the Karatoya River, adjacent to Nagardala Bazar. It was built on 20 decimals (0.2 acres) of donated land. It borders Porjana Union in the west, Rupabati Union in the south Beltail Union in the north and Bangali River in the east. It has an area of 52 square kilometres.

== History ==
Habibullah Nagar is named after Hazrat Shah Habibullah Yemeni, one of the main disciples of 14th-century Sufi preacher Makhdum Shah Daulah Shahid. He helped spread Islam in these villages and was buried in the village of Badalbari. 10-year chairman Tasin Uddin Sarkar donated the land for the construction of the Habibullah Nagar Union Council Complex building. He did not take a single Bangladeshi taka in exchange for this land. Apart from this, he gave the land for educational institutions such as high schools and primary schools. He also contributed a lot to the famous cloth market of Shahzadpur. Under the supervision of the late Tasin Uddin Sarkar, the cloth market became very famous.

== Demography ==
Habibullah Nagar has a population of 45,140.

== Administration ==
Habibullah Nagar constitutes the no. 7 union council of Shahzadpur Upazila. It contains 17 villages:

1. Ratankandi
2. Badalbari
3. Kumirgoalia
4. Nagardala
5. Hamlakola
6. Daya West
7. Khan Para
8. Daya East
9. Berakuchatia
10. Dargarchar
11. Bajiarpara
12. Narua
13. Raipur
14. Faridpangashi
15. Srifaltala
16. Ghosh Srifaltala

=== List of chairmen ===
Name	Term	Notes
Tasir Uddin Sarkar
Muhammad Mahir Uddin
Muhammad Hafizur Rahman
Muhammad Bacchu Sarkar
Muhammad Mizanur Rahman Bacchu

== Education and culture ==
The Union has 25 mosques and nine eidgahs. Habibullahnagaris converse in their native Pabnaiya dialect but can also converse in Standard Bengali. Languages such as Arabic and English are also taught in schools.
