= Nurul Islam Talukder =

Nurul Islam Talukder may refer to:

- Nurul Islam Talukder (Bogra politician)
- Nurul Islam Talukder (Sirajganj politician)
