= Biswajit Ghosh =

Biswajit Ghosh may refer to:

- Biswajit Ghosh (academic)
- Biswajit Ghosh (actor)
