= S. M. Hassan Talukder =

Bangladeshi academic

Professor Dr. S. M. Hassan Talukder
- এস. এম. হাসান তালুকদার

Vice-Chancellor of Rabindra University, Bangladesh
- Incumbent
- Assumed office 24 September 2024
- Preceded by: Md. Shah Azam

Personal details
- Education: Ph.D (Law)
- Alma mater: University of Dhaka

S. M. Hassan Talukder is an academic. He is vice chancellor of Rabindra University, Bangladesh (RUB), professor of law at the University of Dhaka (DU) and professor of the State University of Bangladesh (SUB).
