= Md. Shahjahan (Sirajganj politician) =

Bangladeshi politician

Member of Bangladesh Parliament
- In office 1996–2001
- Preceded by: Ansar Ali Siddiki
- Succeeded by: Choyon Islam

Personal details
- Party: Bangladesh Awami League

Md. Shahjahan is a Bangladesh Awami League politician and a former member of parliament for Sirajganj-6.

== Career ==
Shahjahan was elected to parliament from Sirajganj-6 as a Bangladesh Awami League candidate in 1996.
