= Syed Karam Ali Shah =

Sayyid Karam Ali Shah
- سيد كرم علي شاه
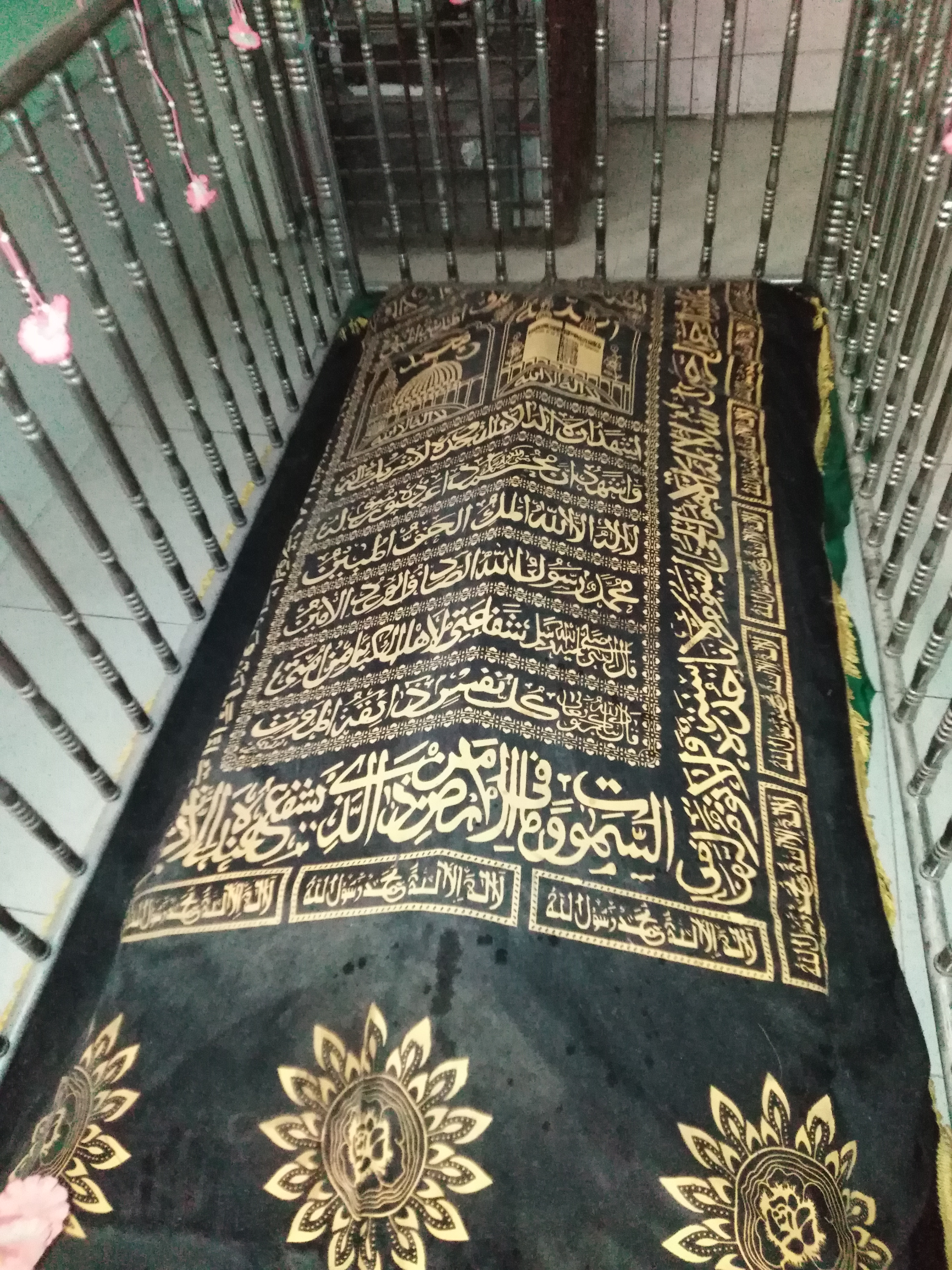
- Tomb of Syed Karam Ali Shah

Personal life
- Born: 13th century Abbasid Persia
- Died: 14th century Biraldaha, Varendra, Delhi Sultanate

Religious life
- Religion: Islam
- Denomination: Sunni
- Tariqa: Suhrawardiyya

Muslim leader
- Based in: Biraldaha
- Post: Sufi mystic
- Disciple of: Shah Makhdum Ruposh

Sayyid Karam ʿAlī Shāh (Arabic: سيد كرم علي شاه, Bengali: সৈয়দ করম আলী শাহ) was a 14th-century Sufi saint, Islamic preacher and holy warrior based in the Varendra region of Bengal. He is best known as a prominent disciple of Shah Makhdum Ruposh and is associated with the propagation of Islam in Rajshahi and Natore. His mausoleum is located in the village of Biraldaha. Every Friday, many devout Muslims visit his shrine for pilgrimage.

== Early life and migration to Bengal ==
Sayyid Karam Ali Shah was born in the 13th century to a Sunni Muslim Sayyid family of merchants from Persia claiming descent from Ali, the fourth Caliph of Islam. He was part of a missionary group dispatched to the Delhi Sultanate before the Siege of Baghdad by Mongol prince Hulegu Khan in 1258. This group included Sayyid Azallah Shah, from the family of Abdul Qadir Gilani, who entrusted his three sons: Sayyid Ahmad Ali Tannuri (Miran Shah), Sayyid Abdul Quddus Jalaluddin (Shah Makhdum Ruposh), and Sayyid Munir Ahmad with propagating Islam particularly in Bengal. Sayyid Karam Ali Shah arrived in Bengal in approximately 1289 as a companion of Shah Makhdum Ruposh. (Note: Some biographical sources have erroneously identified him as a contemporary of Makhdum Shah Daulah (who arrived in Rajshahi c. 1519), likely due to confusion over the shared honorific "Makhdum".)

== Missionary activities ==
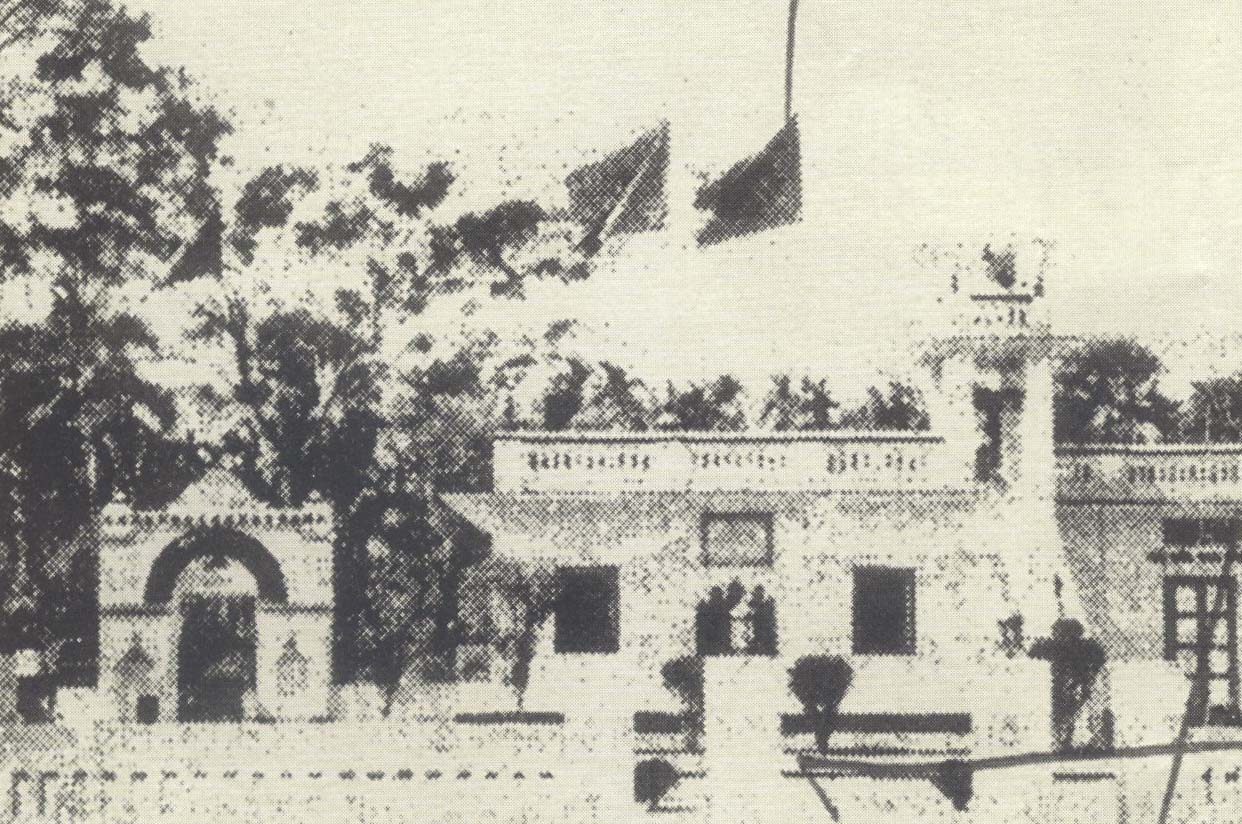
The Shyampur Dairah Sharif located in present-day Ramganj Upazila, Lakshmipur District was the initial hub for the Qadiriyya before the martyrdom of Turkan Shah in Varendra.

The Qadiri missionary group initially settled at the Shyampur Dairah Sharif, a Sufi khanqah located in the Bhulua Kingdom, where they began preaching Islam. Later, Syed Karam Ali Shah followed his murshid Shah Makhdum Ruposh to the village of Bagha in Varendra. This journey was commemorated in a copperplate inscription dated 1582 CE (990 AH), which describes Ruposh traveling with four dervishes: Syed Dilal Bukhari, Syed Abbas, Syed Sultan, and Shah Karam Ali Shah. (Note: Although not mentioned in the inscription, the number of dervishes is believed to have been more than four, with some sources also including the mention of Nusrat Shah.) A portion of the inscription reads:

...With four accomplished dervishes, Hazrat Abdul Quddus Shah (R.) journeyed across the river towards the Gaur kingdom on the back of a crocodile. Among the dervishes were Hazrat Dilal Bukhari (R.), Hazrat Shah Abbas (R.), Hazrat Shah Sultan (R.), and Hazrat Karam Ali Shah (R.)...

The inscription notes their miraculous crossing of a river (identified as the Padma) on the back of a crocodile, symbolizing divine aid. The migration to Varendra was motivated by the martyrdom of the earlier preacher Turkan Shah (Shah Turkan Shahid), killed by the local tantric ruler Raja Angsu Deo Chandavandi Varmabhoj and subsequently sacrificed to Mahakala. The dervishes sought to continue and avenge this mission through preaching and, when necessary, armed resistance.

Following the instructions of Shah Makhdum Ruposh, Syed Karam Ali Shah established his house in a forested area of the Biraldaha village, located about 17 kilometers east of Rajshahi city along the Rajshahi-Natore highway. From there, he began spreading Islam in the surrounding areas. Many were drawn to his character and came to hear his teachings. His spiritual wisdom spread widely, and many embraced Islam under his influence.

=== Battle of Ghoramara (1326) ===
After settling in Bagha, Syed Karam Ali Shah and the other dervishes, under Shah Makhdum’s leadership, began preparing for battle. Although they arrived in 1289 CE, the first battle took place in 1326. Many soldiers and horses died on both sides. The battlefield later came to be known as "Ghoramara" (Horse Killer). Today, there is a post office in Ghoramara, near Boalia in central Rajshahi. The outcome of this battle is not recorded in history. However, historians believe that neither side achieved a decisive victory.

=== Second Battle ===
Since the first battle ended without resolution, a second battle became held. The local feudal lords in Rajshahi regrouped with more power. Meanwhile, the number of Muslim dervishes increased as their preaching continued. In this battle, the dervishes won, and the feudal lords fled. To commemorate the victory, a triumphal arch was built in Bagha and the area was renamed to Makhdumnagar. The ruins of this arch still exist, and the battle was documented on a stone plaque.

=== Third Battle ===
The feudal lords launched one final attack on the dervishes. This battle was fierce, with heavy casualties on both sides. At one point, Shah Makhdum Ruposh threw his wooden sandals in the battle, and legend says two royal princes died from the strike. Shocked by this miracle, Shah Makhdum brought the princes back to life. Amazed, the king and his people embraced Islam. Their graves were once preserved in Shah Makhdum’s shrine compound, but later replaced by an ablution area. That, too, was eventually demolished and replaced with a new mosque.

== Later life and death ==
After the war, peace returned to Rajshahi. The former local rulers continued governing the region. Syed Karam Ali Shah had shown great valor in all three battles, which earned him the title "Ghazi". Following Shah Makhdum’s guidance, he left Rajshahi to spread Islam elsewhere. He went about 17 miles east to Biraldaha village in Puthia Upazila and resumed his preaching. It is said that a large cat used to accompany him and would clean homes with its tail. This is how the village came to be called Biraldaha ("the place of the cat"). He was buried in a mazar (mausoleum) complex which includes a mosque (Biraldaha Mosque) and associated institutions, such as the Syed Karam Ali Darus Sunnat Fazil Madrasah (established 1963) and Biraldaha Syed Karam Ali Shah High School.

== Gallery ==
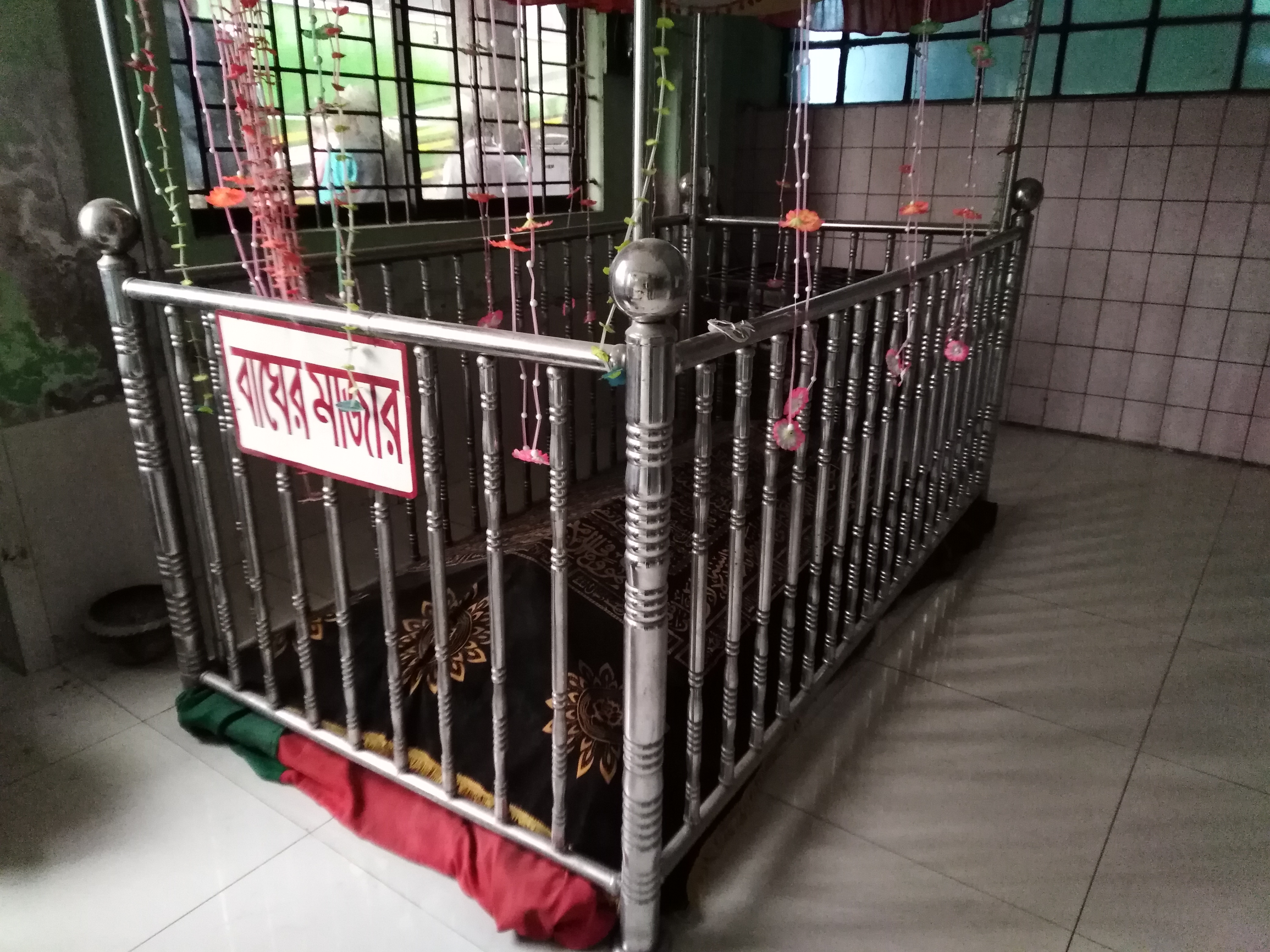
Tiger’s Shrine

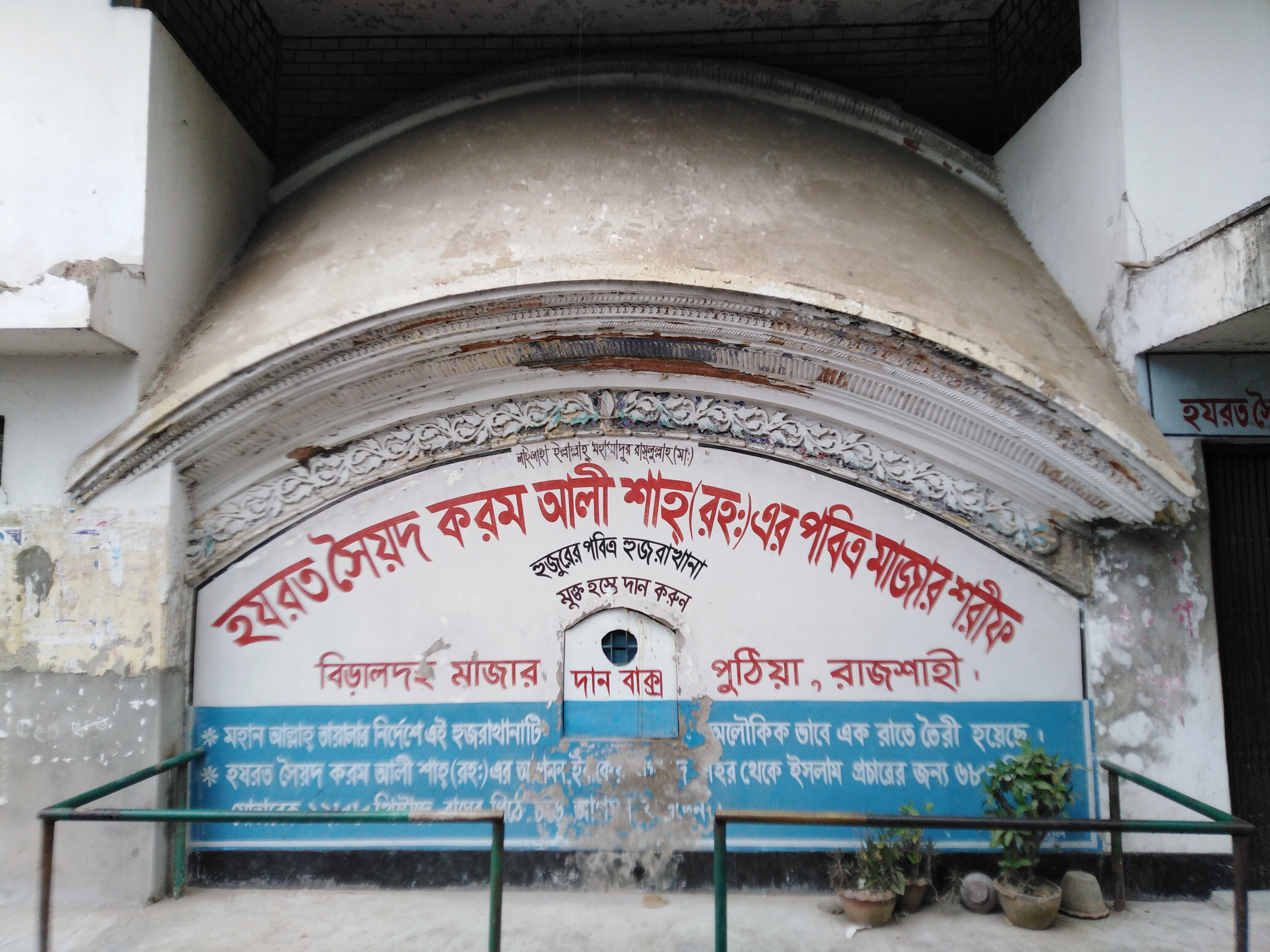
Exterior of the shrine
