= Mohiuddin Mahdi =

- মহিউদ্দীন মাহদী

Personal life
- Born: Bengal Subah
- Died: 1676 Godagari, Bengal Subah
- Resting place: Jhunjhuni Shah Mazar
- Other name: Jhunjhuni Shah

Religious life
- Religion: Islam
- Denomination: Sunni
- Tariqa: Suhrawardiyya

Muslim leader
- Based in: Godagari
- Post: Sufi mystic
- Influenced by: Shah Makhdum Rupos
- Influenced: Alivardi Khan

Sirāj as-Sālikīn Sayyid Muḥyī ad-Dīn Mahdī (Bengali: মহিউদ্দীন মাহদী; died 1676), popularly referred to as Jhunjhuni Shah (Bengali: ঝুনঝুনি শাহ) or Jhunjhuni Baba (Bengali: ঝুনঝুনি বাবা), was a 17th-century Sufi saint and Islamic preacher based in the region of Varendra in Bengal. After his death, the Nawab of Bengal Alivardi Khan ordered the construction of a mazar in his memory.

== Early life and family ==
Mahdi was born into a Bengali family of Qadiri Sufis in Rajshahi, then part of the Bengal Subah (now Bangladesh). He was claimed to be a descendant of Rashidun caliph Ali via Abdul Qadir Gilani, and his great great-grandfather Hazrat Shah Nur settled near Rajshahi in the 15th century where he contributed to the propagation of Islam.

== Career ==
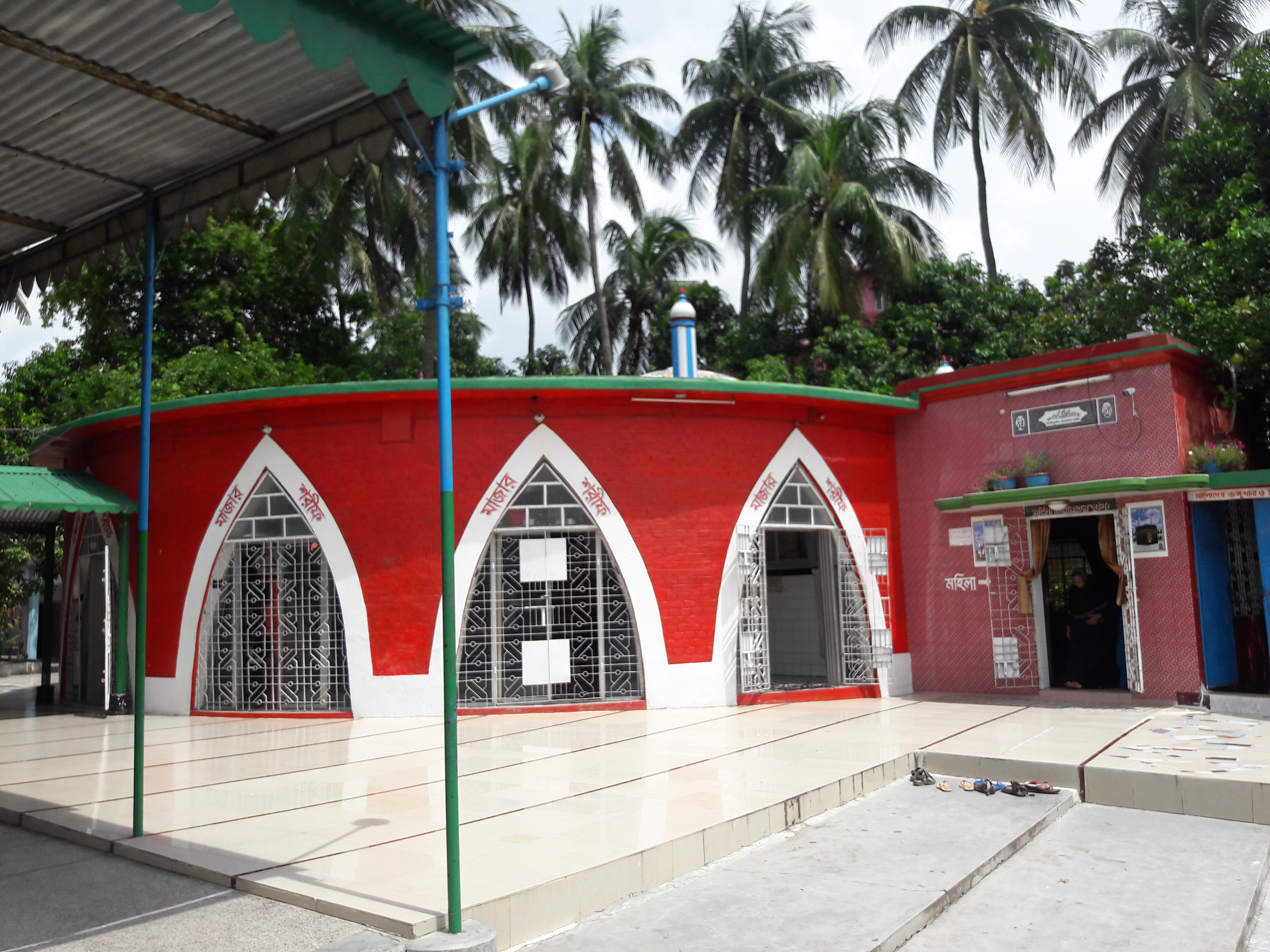
Shrine of Shah Makhdum Rupos where Mohiuddin Mahdi Shah would spend his days

Upon the culmination of his rigorous and deeply contemplative engagement with Islamic studies, Mahdi—whose intellectual journey had been marked by discipline, devotion, and an earnest pursuit of theological understanding—found himself gradually and irresistibly drawn not toward the structured pursuits of a conventional vocation, but rather toward the more ethereal and transcendent realm of spiritual communion and worship. It became increasingly apparent to him that his soul yearned not for accolades or advancement in the temporal world, but for a more profound and intimate relationship with Allah.

Thus, with quiet determination and an unshakable sense of spiritual purpose, he began to undertake a daily pilgrimage to a site of immense personal and ancestral significance: the hallowed Dargah of Shah Makhdum Rupos. This sacred locale, bearing the name of a distant kinsman whose historical contributions to the spread of Islam in the region of Varendra had long been revered, became for him both a sanctuary and a sacred theatre of devotion. Within the tranquil confines of this consecrated space, he immersed himself wholly in the worship of Allah, surrendering the better part of six years to uninterrupted namaz, dhikr, and spiritual introspection. So complete was his dedication that he seldom ventured beyond the shrine’s immediate environs, and those who revered his piety took it upon themselves to ensure his physical sustenance. These humble offerings, brought by the faithful with quiet reverence, most often included his preferred fare: fresh milk and an assortment of fruits, each imbued with symbolic resonance and nourishing simplicity.

Then, as though summoned by the gentle whisper of destiny itself, there came upon him one night a vision—a dream not of the ordinary kind, but one that seemed to shimmer with the ineffable light of divine origin. In this dream, the venerable figure of Shah Makhdum Rupos appeared before him. With eyes that bore the weight of generations and a voice that resonated with both tenderness and command, the apparition addressed him thus:

মুহতরম মহিউদ্দিন, সফর করো
Beloved Mohiuddin, arise and travel!

No further explanation was offered, nor was any required. The message, though succinct, carried with it an unmistakable sense of spiritual urgency and divine instruction. Upon awakening, Mahdi—his heart alight with newfound purpose and his soul stirred by a celestial imperative—did not hesitate. He took this visitation as a sacred call to action, a summons from beyond the veil of dreams to carry forth the light of his faith into the wider world.

And so, after years of cloistered devotion within the sanctuary walls, he stepped once more into the world of men. With humility in his bearing and fire in his speech, he began to journey from place to place, imparting wisdom, offering guidance, and preaching the eternal truths of his tradition to all who would listen. His travels, inspired by a dream yet guided by divine providence, marked the beginning of a new chapter—one defined not by solitude, but by sacred outreach.

Thus began his solemn peregrination across the varied landscapes that comprised the region in and around Varendra—a journey not of conquest or public acclaim, but one characterized by quietude, mystery, and the enigmatic rhythm of one deeply immersed in the unseen realms of spirit. Wherever his feet carried him, from dusty village paths to bustling thoroughfares, Mahdi moved like a man suspended between worlds: wholly present in body, yet adrift in the boundless currents of inner contemplation.

Curiously, and much to the bewilderment of those who encountered him, he seldom engaged in spoken conversation. Though his presence was often noted and his bearing regarded with a kind of reverent awe, he maintained a silence that seemed more intentional than aloof—an inward gaze, as though listening to some sacred dialogue inaudible to mortal ears.

Yet he did not walk in total muteness. To the attentive observer, it became evident that his lips moved frequently, forming whispered phrases—murmurs that floated just beneath the threshold of comprehension. These utterances, though soft and seemingly spontaneous, possessed an intensity that suggested ritual or revelation. No one, however, could discern their full meaning.

His biographer, the meticulous and somewhat perplexed Mohammad Zahurul Islam, would later record that these fragmented expressions—when they could be captured at all—often unfolded in patterns that defied conventional logic. They were at once contradictory and meandering, laced with riddles and paradoxes, as though he were speaking in a language known only to the soul, or conversing with some invisible interlocutor beyond the veil of earthly perception.

To some, his murmurings were the echoes of divine madness; to others, they were the utterances of one who had touched something too immense, too sacred, to ever be translated into ordinary speech. Having traversed the breadth and subtle depths of the Varendra region, his journey gradually came to a natural pause. In a secluded forested expanse, not far from what is now recognised as the Godagari police station, some twenty miles to the west of Rajshahi's bustling heart, he chose to settle. It was here, amidst the hush of trees and the quiet murmur of unseen creatures, that he constructed for himself a modest hut—humble in form, yet imbued with a sanctity that transcended its simple structure. This dwelling, cradled in solitude and silence, became his new sanctuary. There, surrounded by the undisturbed breath of the natural world, he resumed his life of devotion, sinking once more into the depths of prayer, and reflection. Throughout his earlier wanderings, he had always carried with him a curious object: a staff to which small, delicate bells had been fastened near its upper end. With each step he took, this staff would produce a gentle, rhythmic chime—a sound that echoed through village lanes and forest paths alike: jhun jhun, jhun jhun—a lilting cadence that seemed to mark not only his physical movement but his spiritual passage through the world. It was from this peculiar and haunting sound that his moniker arose. The people, stirred by affection, reverence, and perhaps a touch of superstition, began to refer to him simply as Jhunjhuni Shah or Jhunjhuni Baba. Over time, the original name of the man, once etched in the annals of his ancestry, began to fade like script on ancient parchment, replaced in the collective memory by this evocative title. It was as though his identity had been reshaped by the echo of his steps, by the mystery of his silence, and by the strange sounds of a soul forever walking the narrow path between heaven and earth.

== Death ==
Hazrat Mohiuddin Mahdi (Jhunjhuni Shah) died in 1076 AH (1676 CE). To this day, the urs (death anniversary) is observed each year on the final Thursday and Friday of the month of Magh. Word of his legacy reached the ears of Nawab Alivardi Khan. While journeying through Godagari—ostensibly for the purposes of hunting and leisure—he was struck by the quiet veneration that still lingered around the forest where Mahdi had once dwelled. So inspired was the Nawab by the profundity of this humble sage’s life that he resolved to ensure that the memory of Hazrat Mohiuddin Mahdi would not fade into the obscurity to which time consigns so many. Thus, under royal patronage and with considerable architectural ambition, a grand mazar was commissioned. Rising from the forest floor where once only silence and birdsong reigned, a majestic structure of stone and reverence took form—a mazar crowned with a resplendent dome.
