= Abu Bakar (Sirajganj politician) =

Bangladeshi politician

- আবু বকর

Member of Parliament for Pabna-6
- In office 7 March 1973 – 6 November 1976
- Preceded by: Seats start
- Succeeded by: AKM Mahbubul Islam

Personal details
- Born: Sirajganj
- Party: Bangladesh Awami League

Abu Bakar is a politician from Sirajganj district of Bangladesh. He elected a member of parliament from Pabna-6 in 1973 Bangladeshi general election.

== Career ==
Abu Bakar was elected a Member of Parliament from Pabna-6 constituency as a Bangladesh Awami League candidate in the 1973 Bangladeshi general election.
