= Godagari School & College =

Godagari Government High School & College
- Godagari, Rajshahi District; Bangladesh

Information
- Type: High school and college
- Established: 1905 (minor school), 1948 (high school), 1998 (college)
- School board: Board of Intermediate and Secondary Education, Rajshahi
- Principal: Moinul Islam
- Grades: J.S.C - S.S.C - Degree
- Website: gghsc.edu.bd

Godagari Government High School & College (Bengali: গোদাগাড়ী সরকারী উচ্চ বিদ্যালয় এবং কলেজ) is the main school of Godagari Upazila under Rajshahi District.

== History ==
It was established in the year 1905 with the name minor school. In the year 1948, it was upgraded to a high school and in the year 1998 it was upgraded to an intermediate college as well as school. It was nationalized on 13 September 2018.
