= Abdur Razzak Mukul =

Bangladeshi politician

- আব্দুর রাজ্জাক মুকুল

Member of the 1st Jatiya Sangsad
- In office 1973–1976
- Preceded by: Syed Hossain Mansur
- Succeeded by: Syed Hossain Mansur
- Constituency: Pabna-7

Personal details
- Born: Shahzadpur, Pabna District
- Party: Bangladesh Awami League
- Relatives: Rafiqul Islam Bakul (brother)

Abdur Razzak Mukul (Bengali: আব্দুর রাজ্জাক মুকুল) was a Bangladeshi politician and freedom fighter. He was the former Member of Parliament for Pabna-7.

== Early life and family ==
Mukul was born into a Bengali Muslim family in Shahzadpur, Pabna District. His brother, Rafiqul Islam Bakul, was a three-time MP for Pabna-5.

== Career ==
Mukul participated in the six point movement, Bengali language movement and Bangladesh Liberation War. He was elected to the first Jatiya Sangsad from Pabna-7 as an Awami League candidate following the 1973 Bangladeshi general election.
