= Shahjadpur Kachharibari =

Bangladeshi ancestral home of prominent family

Coordinates: 24.1752°N 89.5939°E

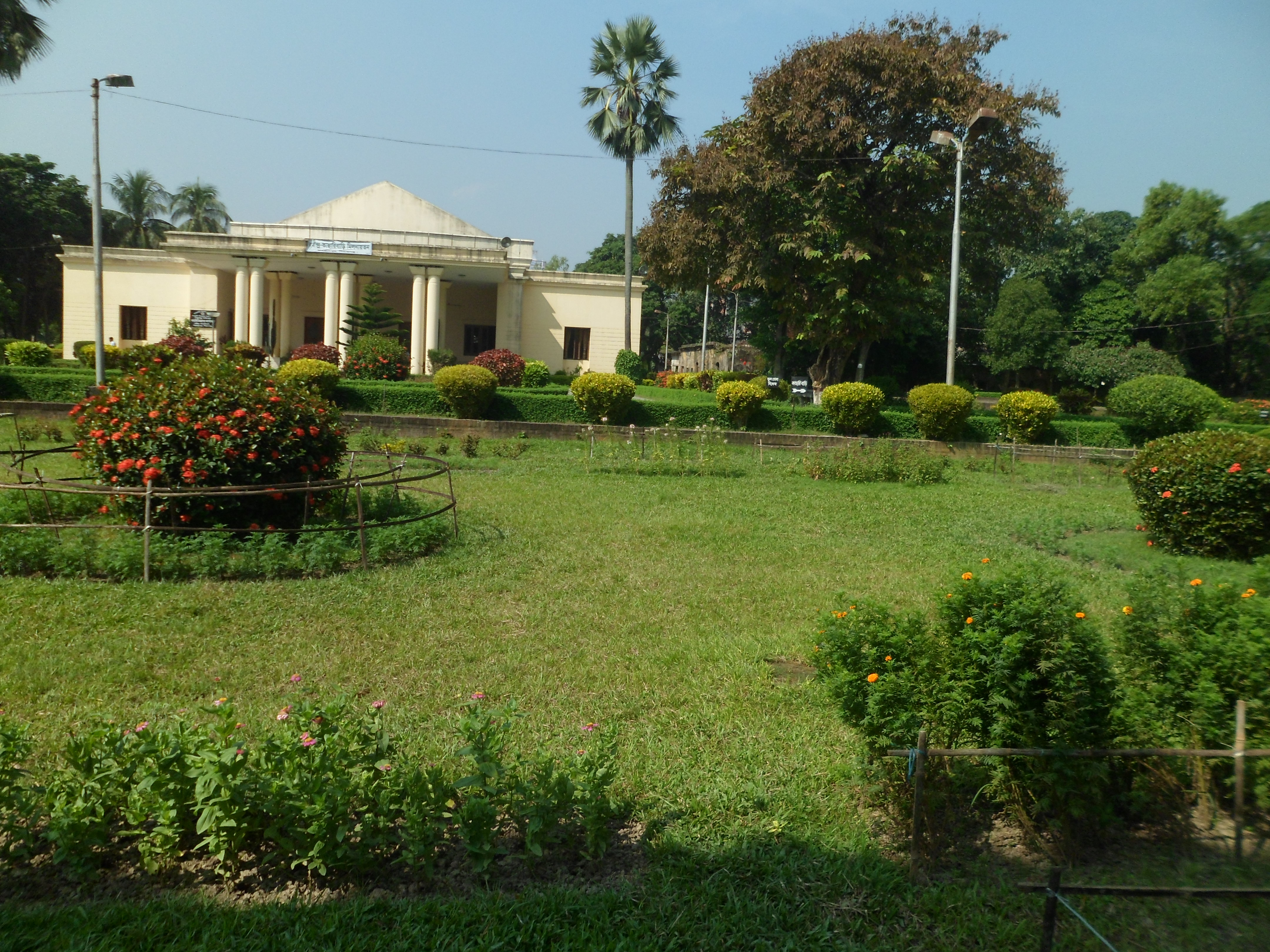
Rabindra Kachharibari, Bangladesh

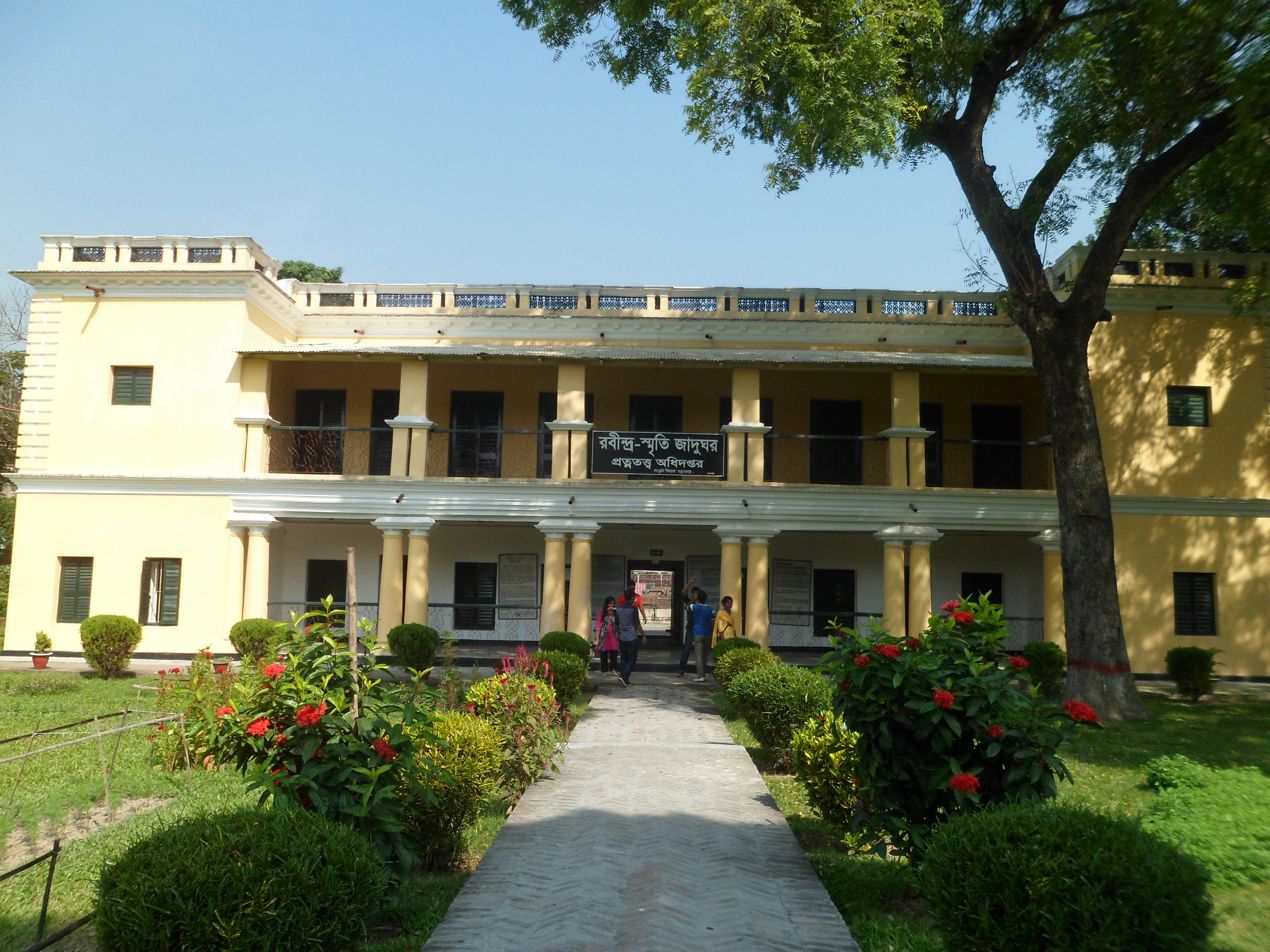
Rabindra Memorial Museum, Bangladesh

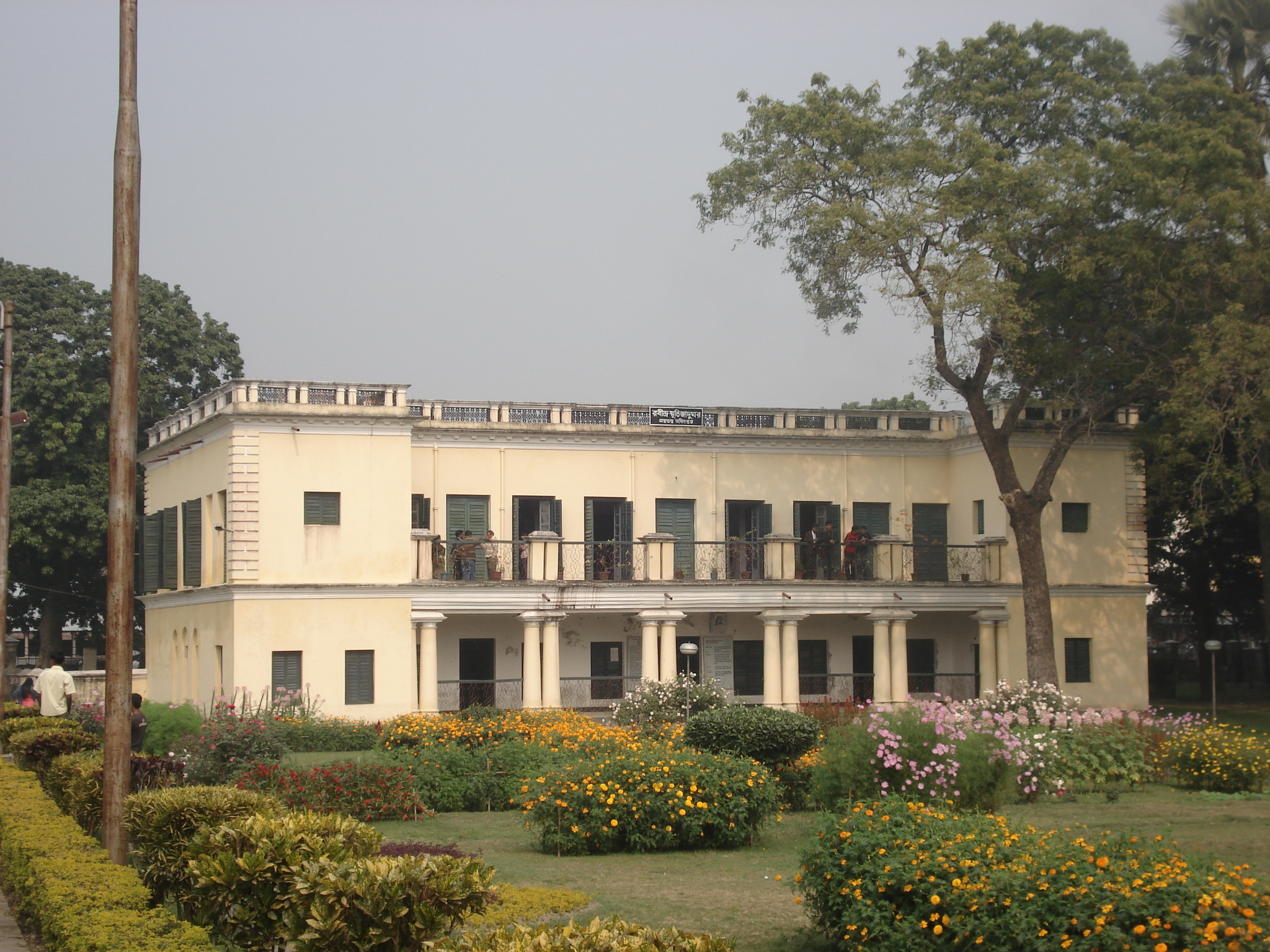
Shahjadpur Kachharibari

Kachharibari (Bengali: কাছারি-বাড়ি revenue office) also known as Rabindra Kachharibari (রবীন্দ্র কাছারি বাড়ি) or Rabindra Memorial Museum in Shahzadpur, Sirajganj District in the Division of Rajshahi, Bangladesh, is the ancestral home and revenue office of the Tagore family. Rabindranath Tagore created many of his literary works while living in this mansion. His grandfather, Dwarkanath Tagore purchased the estate in 1840, and Tagore would often visit in the late-1800s to escape the busier side of his life. Tagore wrote part of his plays Bishorjon, Sonar Tori, Chitra, Chaitali, Golapguchchho, Chhinnapatra, Panchabhooter Diary and Meyeli Chhara in Shahzadpur.

"Here (Shahzadpur) I am more inspired to write than anywhere else," Tagore wrote in a letter to his niece Indira Debi.

The building has since been converted into a museum and a memorial in his name. Many artefacts and memorabilia items are on display in the museum, including shoes, wooden sandals, a piano and a harmonium. The building itself is of interesting architectural heritage, and contains 7 rooms. Maintenance by the authorities has been patchy. Some areas have been well-restored, while others are in desperate need of repair. It has been reported that significant repairs are taking place as of 2012, Tagore's 150th birth anniversary.

Each year, locals and officials celebrate Tagore's birthday at the mansion. This falls on three days around 25 Boishakh in the Bengali calendar, generally correlating with the 6 to 8 May.

The museum is located in the town of Shahzadpur, open Monday to Saturday, 9 am to 6 pm. Entry fee is 20 taka.
