= Godagari Upazila =

Godagari Upazila গোদাগাড়ী উপজেলা
- Upazila of Bangladesh
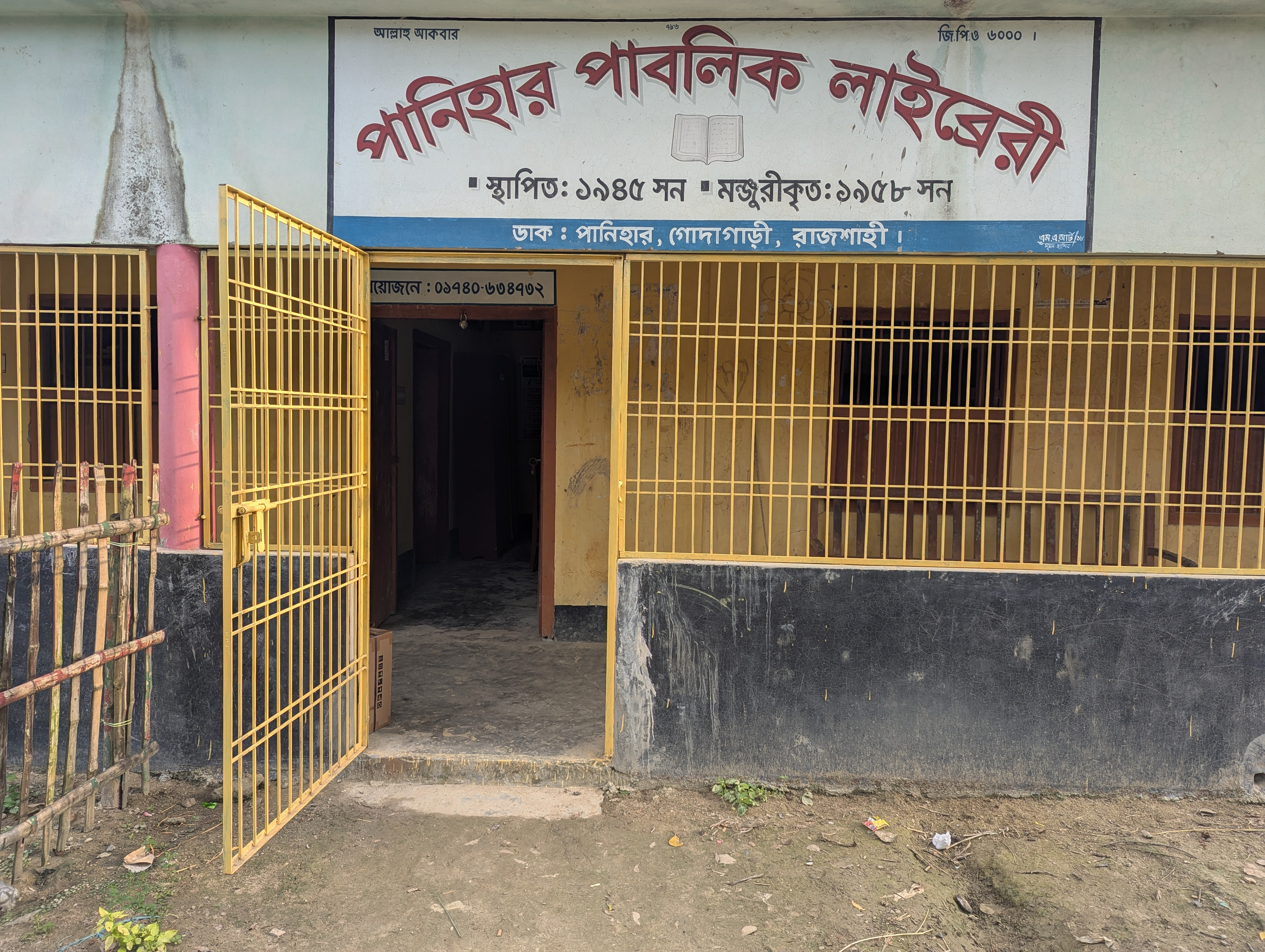
- Panihar Public Library, Godagari, Rajshahi

- Coordinates: 24°28′N 88°19.8′E
- Country: Bangladesh
- Division: Rajshahi
- District: Rajshahi

Area
  - Total: 475.26 km^{2} (183.50 sq mi)

Population (2022)
  - Total: 376,386
  - Density: 791.96/km^{2} (2,051.2/sq mi)
- Time zone: UTC+6 (BST)
- Postal code: 6290
- Area code: 07225
- Website: Official Map of Godagari

Godagari Upazila mauza geocode map

Godagari Upazila (Bengali: গোদাগাড়ী উপজেলা) is an Upazila of Rajshahi District in the Division of Rajshahi, Bangladesh. This is the place where Mahananda river fall to Padma or Ganges.

== History ==
The Deopara Prashasti, an important inscription in Sanskrit poetry describing the Sena dynasty of ancient Bengal, was discovered near the village of Deopara.

== Geography ==
Godagari is located at 24.4667°N 88.3306°E. It has 72,186 households and total area 475.26 km^{2}.

Godagari Upazila is bounded by Chapai Nawabganj Sadar Upazila of Chapai Nawabganj district and Tanore Upazila on the north, Tanore and Paba Upazilas on the east, Lalgola, Bhagawangola I and Bhagawangola II CD Blocks, in Murshidabad district, West Bengal, India, all across the Ganges/Padma, on the south, and Chapai Nawabganj Sadar Upazila on the west.

== Demographics ==
Religions in Godagari Upazila (2022)
| Religion | Percent |
| Islam | 88.85% |
| Hinduism | 6.76% |
| Christianity | 3.83% |
| Other or not stated | 0.56% |

According to the 2022 Bangladeshi census, Godagari Upazila had 92,719 households and a population of 376,386. 10.31% of the population were under 5 years of age. Godagari had a literacy rate (age 7 and over) of 73.50%: 72.84% for males and 74.12% for females, and a sex ratio of 96.79 males for every 100 females. 83,966 (22.31%) lived in urban areas.

According to the 2011 Census of Bangladesh, Godagari Upazila had 72,186 households and a population of 330,924. 75,724 (22.88%) were under 10 years of age. Godagari had a literacy rate (age 7 and over) of 46.34%, compared to the national average of 51.8%, and a sex ratio of 990 females per 1000 males. 61,176 (18.49%) lived in urban areas. Ethnic population was 24,438 (7.38%), of which Santal were 11,440 and Oraon 6,752.

As of the 1991 Bangladesh census, Godagari has a population of 217,811. Males constitute 50.88% of the population, and females 49.12%. This Upazila's eighteen up population is 108869. Godagari has an average literacy rate of 27.6% (7+ years), and the national average of 32.4% literate.

According to the 2022 census, total population was 376,386. Ethnic population was 24,140( 6.41%) in which Santal people was 10,703, Oraon people was 6,447 and Munda people was 1,290.

Population of upazila by ethnicity (2022)
1. Bengali (93.6%)
2. Santal (2.84%)
3. Oraon (1.71%)
4. Munda (0.34%)
5. Others (1.52%)

== Points of interest ==
Padumsa Dighi (pond) of Raja Bijoy Sen at village Deopara (eleventh century), tomb of Shah Sultan Mohiuddin Mahdi at Sultanganj (fourteenth century), tomb of Ali Quli Beg at Kumarpur,

== Administration ==
Godagari thana was established in 1865 and was turned into an upazila in 1984.

Godagari Upazila is divided into Godagari Municipality, Kakanhat Municipality, and nine union parishads: Basudebpur, Char Ashariadaha, Deopara, Godagari, Gogram, Matikata, Mohanpur, Pakri, and Rishikul. The union parishads are subdivided into 389 mauzas and 398 villages.

== Education ==
According to Banglapedia, Godagari School & College, founded in 1905, is a notable secondary school.
