= Shah Makhdum Ruposh =

Bangladeshi Sufi

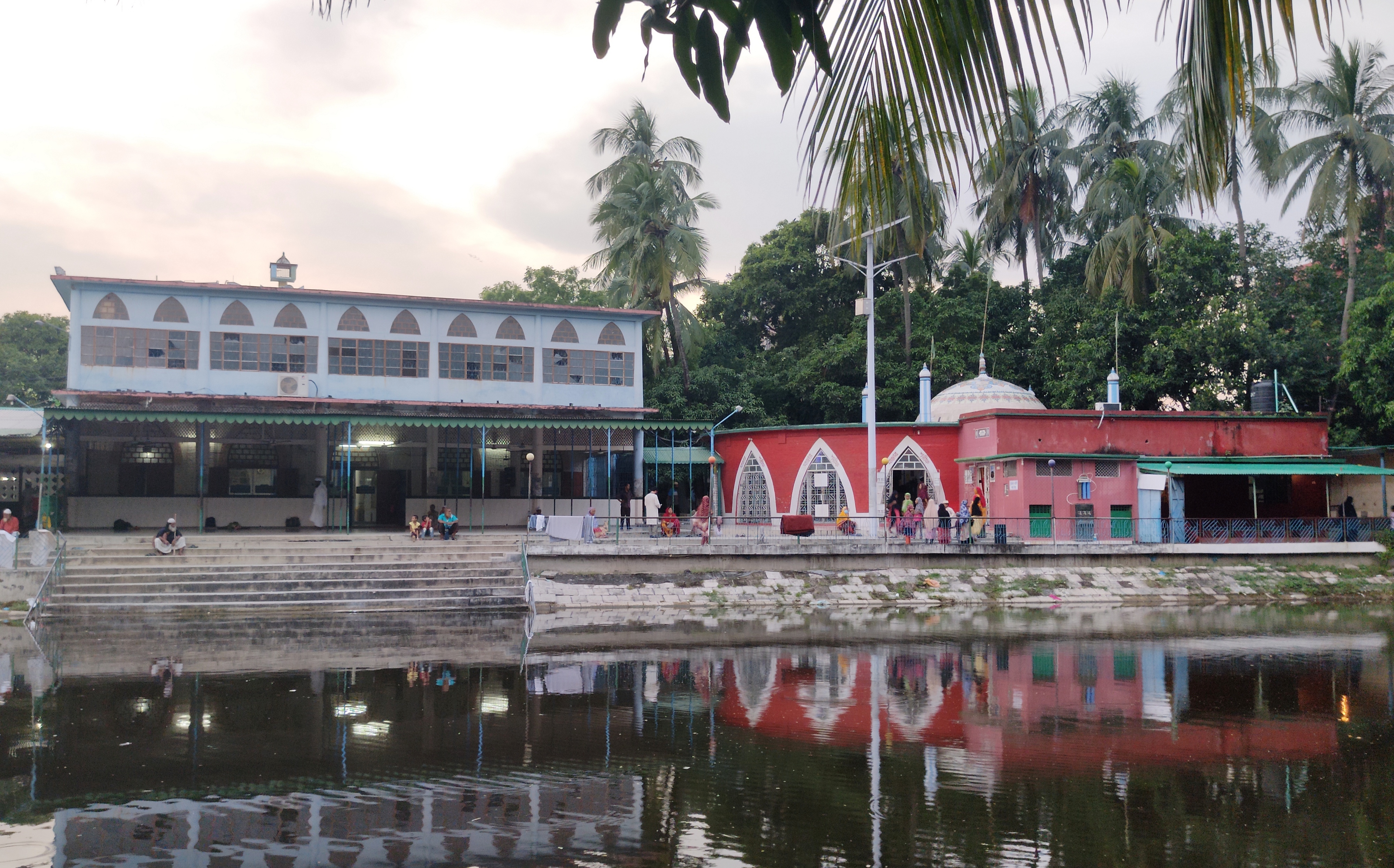
- Dargah of Shah Makhdum

Personal life
- Born: Abdul Quddus Jalaluddin; 1216 Baghdad
- Died: 1313 (aged 96–97) Rampur Boalia
- Resting place: Dargah Para, Rajshahi, Bangladesh
- Parent: Sayyid Ajillah Shah (father)
- Other name: Ruposh

Religious life
- Religion: Islam
- Denomination: Sunni
- Tariqa: Suhrawardiyya

Muslim leader
- Based in: Rajshahi
- Post: Sufi scholar and mystic
- Disciples: Syed Karam Ali Shah
- Influenced: Mohiuddin Mahdi

Sayyid ‘Abd al-Quddūs Jalāl ad-Dīn (Arabic: عبد القدوس جلال الدين), best known as Shāh Makhdūm Rūposh (Bengali: শাহ মখদূম রূপস), was a Sufi Muslim figure in Bangladesh. He is associated with the spread of Islam into the Varendra region of Bengal. He arrived in Bengal with his elder brother Syed Ahmad (Miran Shah) from Baghdad. Shah Makhdum Airport of Rajshahi is named after him.

== Life ==
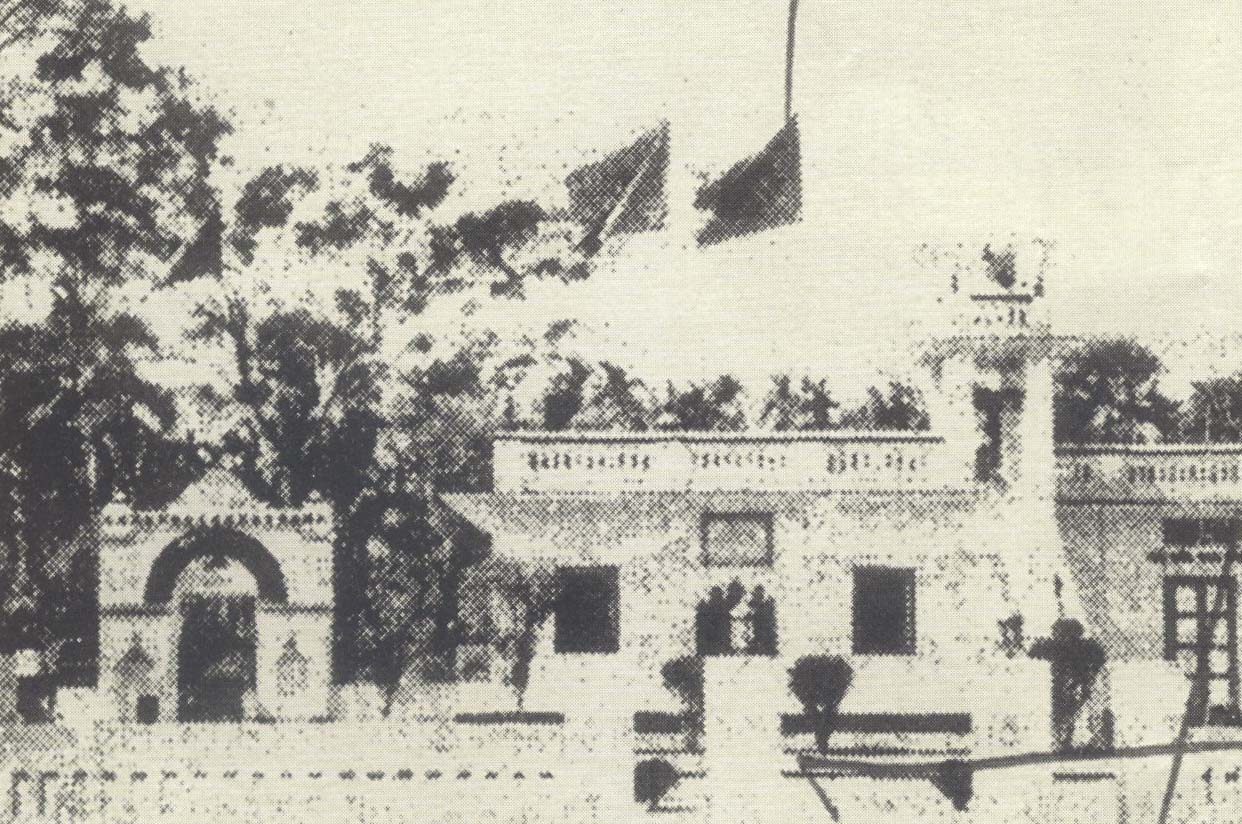
The Shyampur Dairah Sharif located in present-day Ramganj Upazila, Lakshmipur District was the initial hub for the Qadiriyya before the martyrdom of Turkan Shah in Varendra.

Abd al-Quddus was born in 1216 to a Sunni Muslim Sayyid family in Baghdad descended from the Sufi saint Abdul Qadir Gilani. He earned the nickname of Ruposh as he was known to cover his face with a piece of cloth in the manner of a section of the saints of the Chishti Order. At one point, a Sufi missionary group was dispatched to the Delhi Sultanate before the Siege of Baghdad by Mongol prince Hulegu Khan in 1258. The group included Sayyid Ajillah Shah, who entrusted his three sons: Sayyid Ahmad Ali Tannuri (Miran Shah), Sayyid Abdul Quddus Jalaluddin (Shah Makhdum Ruposh), and Sayyid Munir Ahmad with propagating Islam particularly in Bengal. They arrived in Bengal in approximately 1289. Ruposh' elder brother, Sayyid Ahmad Tannuri (Miran Shah), established a khanqah in the village of Kanchanpur in the Bhulua Kingdom. The Sufis under Ruposh's leadership established the Shyampur Dairah Sharif, another Sufi khanqah in Bhulua, where they began preaching Islam. Two years later, Ruposh led his companions to the village of Bagha in Varendra, North Bengal. This journey was commemorated in a copperplate inscription dated 1582 CE (990 AH), which describes Ruposh traveling with four dervishes: Syed Dilal Bukhari, Syed Abbas, Syed Sultan, and Shah Karam Ali Shah. (Note: Although not mentioned in the inscription, the number of dervishes is believed to have been more than four, with some sources also including the mention of Nusrat Shah.) A portion of the inscription reads:

...With four accomplished dervishes, Hazrat Abdul Quddus Shah (R.) journeyed across the river towards the Gaur kingdom on the back of a crocodile. Among the dervishes were Hazrat Dilal Bukhari (R.), Hazrat Shah Abbas (R.), Hazrat Shah Sultan (R.), and Hazrat Karam Ali Shah (R.)...

The inscription notes their miraculous crossing of a river (identified as the Padma) on the back of a crocodile, symbolizing divine aid, though this is not confirmed by any other historical records.The migration to Varendra was motivated by the martyrdom of the earlier preacher Turkan Shah (Shah Turkan Shahid), killed by the local tantric ruler Raja Angsu Deo Chandavandi Varmabhoj and subsequently sacrificed to Mahakala. The dervishes sought to continue and avenge this mission through preaching and, when necessary, armed resistance. To avenge Turkan, Makhdum and his companions defeated the Raja and subsequently established a khanqah in Rampur Boalia (modern-day Rajshahi City). Makhdum then sent his companions to the adjoining areas to set up khanqahs and preach Islam. Bagha was later renamed to Makhdumnagar in his honour. Some of his companions here included Syed Shah Abbas, Syed Dilal Bukhari, Shah Sultan, Syed Karam Ali Shah and Nusrat Shah. Shah Makhdum spent the rest of his life propagating Islam in Rajshahi region.

=== Warfare ===
After settling in Bagha, Shah Makhdum Ruposh and his followers began preparing for battle. Many soldiers and horses died on both sides. The battlefield later came to be known as "Ghoramara" (Horse Killer). Today, there is a post office in Ghoramara, near Boalia in central Rajshahi. The outcome of this battle is not recorded in history. However, historians believe that neither side achieved a decisive victory. Since the Battle of Ghoramara (1326) ended without resolution, a second battle became held. The local feudal lords in Rajshahi regrouped with more power. Meanwhile, the number of Muslim dervish followers increased as their preaching continued. In this battle, the dervishes won, and the feudal lords fled. To commemorate the victory, a triumphal arch was built in Bagha and the area was renamed to Makhdumnagar. The ruins of this arch still exist, and the battle was documented on a stone plaque. The feudal lords launched one final attack on the dervishes. This battle was fierce, with heavy casualties on both sides.

== Death ==
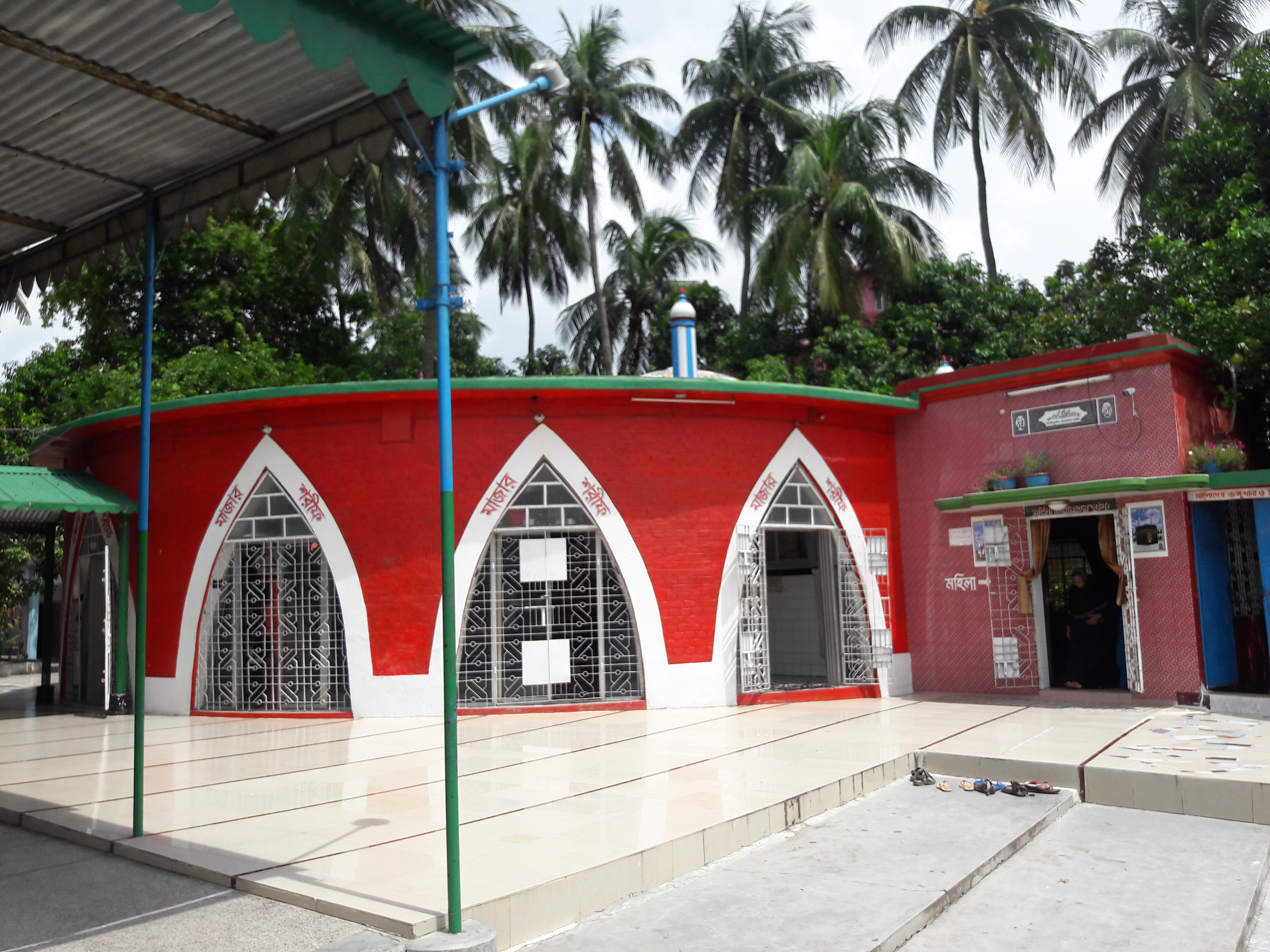
Tomb complex of Shah Makhdum

Although the exact circumstances are unknown, but Makhdum died on 27 Rajab and was buried at Dargah Para in Rampur Boalia. Although some sources mention the year corresponding to 1313 CEE.At first, his grave had no structures built around or on top of it, but during the Mughal period, Ali Quli Beg, a Twelver Shia and servant of Abbas the Great, constructed a square-shaped, one-domed mazar (mausoleum) above the grave. Devotees commemorate Makhdum's death every year with an urs on 27 Rajab at the Dargah premise. The Mutawalli (guardian) of the shrine in 1877 stated that the shrine estate was made rent-free as a gift by Mughal emperor Humayun.

In 1904, the ninth Mutawalli of the estate, Ghulam Akbar, made a statement at the Rajshahi District Court mentioning that although the estate was established in 1634, Shah Makhdum Ruposh was alive 450 years before that (thus placing him in the 12th century in 1184 AD). Shah Nur was the first Mutawalli of the shrine.

== Eponyms ==
- Shah Makhdum Airport
- Shah Makhdum Thana
- Shah Mokhdum Medical College
- Shah Makdum Hall, University of Rajshahi
- Shah Mokhdum College, Rajshahi
