= Syed Hossain Mansur =

Bangladeshi politician

Syed Hossain Mansur Tara Mia

Member of 3rd National Assembly of Pakistan
- In office 1962–1965
- Succeeded by: Abdullah al Mahmood
- Constituency: Pabna-II

Member of 2nd Jatiya Sangsad
- In office 1979–1986
- Preceded by: Abdur Razzak Mukul
- Constituency: Pabna-7

Personal details
- Born: Shahzadpur, Pabna District, Bengal Presidency
- Party: Bangladesh Nationalist Party

Syed Hossain Mansur (Bengali: সৈয়দ হোসেন মনসুর), also known by his daak naam Tara Mia (Bengali: তারা মিঞা), is a Bangladesh Nationalist Party politician and former member of parliament for the Pabna-7 constituency. He also served as a member of the 3rd National Assembly of Pakistan. Mansur served in the national assembly's standing committee on external affairs and was a prominent leader of the Awami League in the East Pakistan period.

== Early life and family ==
Mansur was born to a Bengali Muslim family of Syeds from Shahzadpur in Sirajganj, Pabna District, Bengal Presidency.

== Career ==
In 1962, Mansur was elected to the 3rd National Assembly of Pakistan as a representative of the Pabna-II constituency. He was elected again during the 1970 East Pakistan Provincial Assembly election, as an Awami League candidate. In 1979, he was elected to the Jatiya Sangsad from Pabna-7 as a Bangladesh Nationalist Party candidate.
