= Shah Makhdum Airport =

Domestic airport in Rajshahi, Bangladesh

Shah Makhdum Airport শাহ মাকদুম বিমানবন্দর
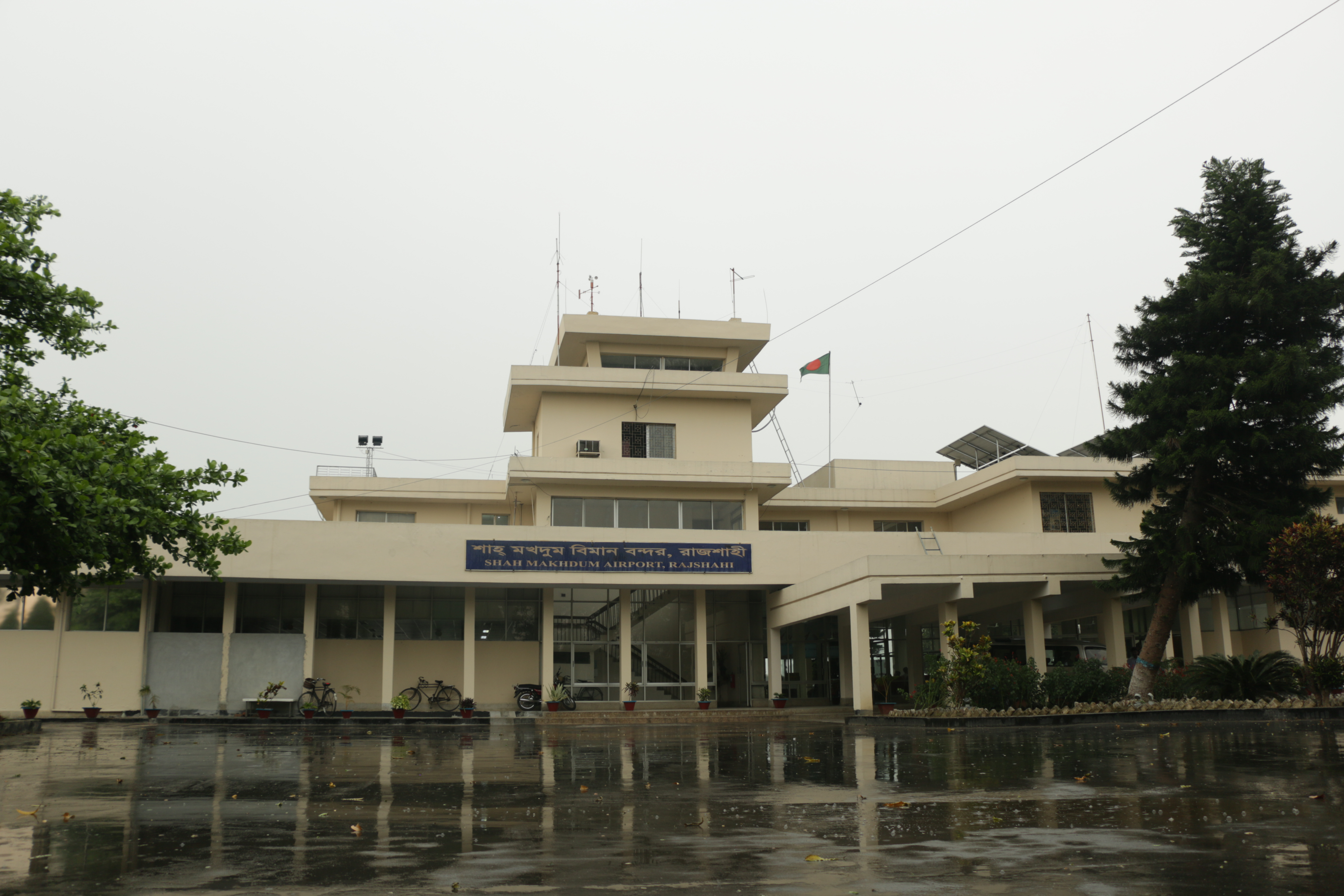
- IATA: RJH; ICAO: VGRJ

Summary
- Airport type: Public
- Operator: Civil Aviation Authority, Bangladesh
- Serves: Rajshahi
- Elevation AMSL: 55 ft (17 m)
- Coordinates: 24°26′13″N 088°36′59″E

Map
- Location of airport in Bangladesh

Runways
| Direction | Length | | Surface |
| Direction | m | ft | Surface |
|---|---|---|---|
| 17/35 | 1,829 | 6,000 | Asphalt |

Statistics (January 2018 – January 2019)
- Passengers: 83,451 ▲
- Source: DAFIF

Shah Makhdum Airport, Rajshahi (IATA: RJH, ICAO: VGRJ) is a domestic airport serving Rajshahi, the principal city of the Rajshahi Division in Bangladesh. The airport‌ is located at Nowhata, about 10 kilometers north from city center of Rajshahi and named after Sufi saint Shah Makhdum Ruposh. The airport also serves as a base for two flying training academies.

== Facilities ==
The airport is situated at an elevation of 55 feet (17 m) above mean sea level. Its only runway, designated 17/35 with an asphalt surface, measures 1,829 by 30 metres (6,001 ft × 98 ft).

== Development ==
A project is going on to increase existing facilities of the airport. After finishing the development project, the terminal will have total 31,000 square feet area. The length of runway will be 10,000 feet long and 150 feet wide. The apron will be 275×250 feet. In November 2024, it was announced that the airport would be revamped to transform it into an international airport.

== Airlines and destinations ==
On 17 November 2022, Novoair became the first airline in the country to operate inter-city flight other than Dhaka, connecting Rajshahi with Cox's Bazar.

| Airlines | Destinations | Refs. |
|---|---|---|
| Biman Bangladesh Airlines | Dhaka | |
| US-Bangla Airlines | Dhaka | |

== Incidents and accidents ==
- 25 April 2013: A 2-seater Cessna 152 (S2-ABI), a flight training aircraft of Bangladesh Flying Academy crash-landed at the airport on 4:24 pm. The aircraft flipped upside-down; the flight instructor and trainee pilot onboard escaped with minor injuries.
- 1 April 2015: Another Cessna 152 (S2-ADI) aircraft of Bangladesh Flying Academy crashed at the airport at around 2 pm and caught fire after the pilot aborted takeoff, sensing technical problems. The accident left the female trainee pilot dead, and the flight instructor with critical burn injuries. After some time, the flight instructor also died.

== See also ==
- List of airports in Bangladesh
- Shah Makhdum Ruposh
