= AKM Mahbubul Islam =

Bangladeshi politician

- এ কে এম মাহবুবুল ইসলাম

Member of Parliament for Pabna-6
- In office 18 February 1979 – 12 February 1982
- Preceded by: Abu Bakar
- Succeeded by: Seat abolished

Personal details
- Born: Shahjadpur, Sirajganj
- Party: Bangladesh Nationalist Party

AKM Mahbubul Islam is a politician from Sirajganj district of Bangladesh. He was elected a member of parliament from Pabna-6 in the 1979 Bangladeshi general election.

== Career ==
AKM Mahbubul Islam was elected a member of parliament from the Pabna-6 constituency as a Bangladesh Nationalist Party candidate in the 1979 Bangladeshi general election.

He stood for the Sirajganj-6 constituency unsuccessfully in the 7th parliamentary elections on 12 June 1996.
