= Kamruddin Ahia Khan Majlish =

Bangladeshi politician (died 2020)

- কামরুদ্দিন এহিয়া খান মজলিশ

Member of Parliament for Sirajganj-7
- In office 26 February 1991 – 30 March 1996
- Preceded by: M. A. Matin
- Succeeded by: Hashibur Rahman Swapon

Personal details
- Born: Sirajganj District, East Bengal, Dominion of Pakistan
- Died: 29 June 2020 (aged 66) Dhaka, Bangladesh
- Party: Bangladesh Nationalist Party
- Nickname: Sarwar

Kamruddin Ahia Khan Majlish (died 29 June 2020) was a politician of the Bangladesh Nationalist Party. He was a two-time Jatiya Sangsad member representing the Sirajganj-7 constituency and a member of the BNP central executive committee.

== Career ==
Majlish was elected a member of parliament by participating in the 5th parliamentary elections held on 26 February 1991 and the 6th parliamentary elections on 15 February 1996. He was a member of the BNP central executive committee.

He was a chairman of Milk Vita and a director and chairman of Agrani Bank.

=== Personal life ===
Majlish was born in Dargapara Mahalla of Shahzadpur municipality in Sirajganj district, the eldest son of Maulana Saifuddin Yahya Khan.

Majlish died on 29 June 2020.
