= Biswajit Ghosh (academic) =

Bangladeshi researcher and professor

- বিশ্বজিৎ ঘোষ

Vice-Chancellor of the Rabindra University
- In office 11 June 2017 – 14 June 2021
- Preceded by: office created
- Succeeded by: Md. Shah Azam

Personal details
- Born: 8 April 1958 (age 68) Barisal, East Pakistan
- Education: Dhaka University
- Occupation: Professor, researcher
- Awards: Bangla Academy Literary Award; Ekushey Padak (2019)

Biswajit Ghosh (born 8 April 1958) is a Bangladeshi professor, essayist and researcher. He is a professor of the Bangla Department at Dhaka University and Incumbent vice-chancellor of the Rabindra University. He was awarded Bangla Academy Literary Award in 2011 and Ekushey Padak in 2019 for his contributions in research.

== Early life ==
Ghosh was born on 8 April 1958 at Kamarkathi village in Barisal of the then East Pakistan (now Bangladesh). He earned his PhD from Dhaka University in 1995.

== Career ==
Ghosh started his career as a lecturer at the Bangla Department of Dhaka University on 1 February 1984. He has been appointed by the Ministry of Education as the first vice chancellor of Rabindra University on 11 June 2017 for four years. He wrote and edited more than 50 books.

== Awards and recognition ==
- Ibrahim Memorial Gold Medal (2017)
- Madhusudan National Medal
- Abdur Rab Chowdhury Memorial Gold Medal
- Enamul Haque Gold Medal
- Bangla Academy Literary Award (2011)
- Ekushey Padak (2019)
