= Sirajganj-7 =

Constituency of Bangladesh's Jatiya Sangsad

- Former constituency for the Jatiya Sangsad
- District: Sirajganj District
- Division: Rajshahi Division

Former constituency
- Created: 1984
- Abolished: 2006

Sirajganj-7 was a constituency represented in the Jatiya Sangsad (National Parliament) of Bangladesh, which was abolished in 2006.

== Members of Parliament ==
Election	Member	Party
1986	M.A. Matin	Jatiya Party (Ershad)
1991	Kamruddin Ahia Khan Majlish	BNP
June 1996	Hashibur Rahman Swapon	BNP
1998 by-election	Choyon Islam	Independent
2001	M.A. Matin	BJP
Abolished constituency

In 1998, Sheikh Hasina appointed Hashibur Rahman Swapon as a Deputy Minister in her government. This led to his expulsion from the BNP and to the Election Commission declaring his seat vacant on 11 October 1999 under Article 70 of the Constitution, which penalizes floor-crossing. This triggered a by-election in late 1999, which Alauddin lost as an Awami League candidate. Choyon Islam was elected in his place.
