= Merina Jahan Kabita =

Bangladeshi politician

- মেরিনা জাহান কবিতা

Member of Parliament
- In office 2 November 2021 – 29 January 2024
- Preceded by: Hashibur Rahman Swapon
- Succeeded by: Choyon Islam
- Constituency: Sirajganj-6

Personal details
- Party: Bangladesh Awami League
- Parent: Mazharul Islam (father)
- Relatives: Choyon Islam (brother)
- Education: University of Dhaka

Merina Jahan Kabita is a Bangladesh Awami League politician and former Jatiya Sangsad member representing the Sirajganj-6 constituency.

== Early life ==
After obtaining degree in Sociology from University of Dhaka, Merina started her career as a lecturer in Eden Mohila College. Before entering politics, she was the principal of the Begum Badrunnesa Government Girls' College from February 2009 to December 2012.

== Career ==
Merina has been involved in Awami League politics since the beginning of her political career. She is the daughter of academic and intellectual Mazharul Islam. She was inspired to join Awami League as her father was involved in Awami League politics. Kabita became a member of the Awami League Central Executive Committee through the national conference of Awami League held in 2016. She also held the same post in the 2019 conference. The SIrajganj-6 constituency fell vacant after Awami League lawmaker Hashibur Rahman Swapon died of Coronavirus on 2 September. In October 2021, she was nominated by-election candidate by Awami League in Sirajganj-6 constituency. Awami League nominee Marina Jahan was elected in the by-election held on 2 November 2021.
