= Sirajganj-6 =

Constituency of Bangladesh's Jatiya Sangsad

- Constituency for the Jatiya Sangsad
- District: Sirajganj District
- Division: Rajshahi Division
- Electorate: 401,155 (2018)

Current constituency
- Created: 1984
- Party: Bangladesh Nationalist Party
- Member: M. A. Muhit
- ← 66 Sirajganj-5 68 Pabna-1 →

Sirajganj-6 is a constituency represented in the Jatiya Sangsad (National Parliament) of Bangladesh since 2026 by M. A. Muhit of the Bangladesh Nationalist Party.

== Boundaries ==
The constituency encompasses Shahjadpur Upazila.

== History ==
The constituency was created in 1984 from the Pabna-5 constituency when the former Pabna District was split into two districts: Sirajganj and Pabna.

Ahead of the 2008 general election, the Election Commission redrew constituency boundaries to reflect population changes revealed by the 2001 Bangladesh census. The 2008 redistricting altered the boundaries of the constituency.

== Members of Parliament ==
| Election | Member | Party |
|---|---|---|
| 1986 | Nurul Islam Talukder | Jatiya Party |
| 1991 | Ansar Ali Siddiki | Bangladesh Nationalist Party |
| Jun 1996 | Md. Shahjahan | Awami League |
| 2001 | Manzur Quader | Bangladesh Nationalist Party |
| 2008 | Choyon Islam | Awami League |
| 2014 | Hashibur Rahman Swapon | Awami League |
| 2021 by-election | Merina Jahan | Awami League |
| 2024 | Choyon Islam | Awami League |
| 2026 | M. A. Muhit | Bangladesh Nationalist Party |
