= Nurul Islam Talukder (Sirajganj politician) =

Bangladeshi politician

Member of Bangladesh Parliament
- In office 1986–1988
- In office 1988–1990

Personal details
- Died: 17 November, 2025
- Party: Jatiya Party (Ershad)

Nurul Islam Talukder (Bengali: নুরুল ইসলাম তালুকদার) is a Jatiya Party (Ershad) politician and a former member of parliament for Sirajganj-6.

== Career ==
Talukder was elected to parliament from Sirajganj-6 as a Jatiya Party candidate in 1986 and 1988.
