= Mazharul Islam (poet) =

Poet, folklorist, and academic

Professor Mazharul Islam
- মাজহারুল ইসলাম

Director General of Bangla Academy
- In office 2 June 1972 – 12 August 1974
- Preceded by: Position established
- Succeeded by: Nilima Ibrahim

Vice-chancellor of University of Rajshahi
- Preceded by: Khan Sarwar Murshid
- Succeeded by: Syed Ali Ahsan

Personal details
- Born: 1 July 1929
- Died: 14 November 2003 (aged 74) Bangkok, Thailand
- Children: Choyon Islam, Merina Jahan Kabita
- Education: Indiana University Bloomington Ph.D.

Mazharul Islam (1 July 1929 – 14 November 2003) was a Bangladeshi poet, folklorist, and academic. He served as the vice-chancellor of the University of Rajshahi. In 1972, he was appointed as the first Director General of Bangla Academy.

== Education and career ==
Islam obtained his PhD in Bengali literature in 1958 and another Ph.D. in folklore studies from Indiana University Bloomington in 1963.

== Personal life and legacy ==
Islam was married to Nurjahan Mazhar. Together they had two sons and two daughters. His four children are Merina Jahan Kabita, a member of the Bangladesh Awami League Central Committee and member of the Jatiya Sangsad from 2021-2024), Choyon Islam, a prominent industrialist and former Member of Parliament (2008–2014), Dr Chanda Islam, professor of Murray State University and Shovon Islam, a prominent computer scientist and one of the leading industrialists of Bangladesh. Shovon Islam is the founder and owner of the garments conglomerate Sparrow Group. He is married to BNP leader Shama Obaid, the daughter of KM Obaidur Rahman.

In 2009, "Mazharul Islam Kabita Puruskar", an annual award to inspiring poets, was introduced by Islam's family.
