= Ansar Ali Siddiqui =

Bangladeshi politician

Member of Bangladesh Parliament
- In office 1991–1996

Personal details
- Party: Bangladesh Nationalist Party

Ansar Ali Siddiqui was a Bangladesh Nationalist Party politician and a member of parliament for Sirajganj-6.

== Career ==
Siddiqui was elected to parliament from Sirajganj-6 as a Bangladesh Nationalist Party candidate in 1991. He served as the state minister for irrigation, water development and flood control.

== Death ==
Siddiqui died on 16 April 2013 in BIRDEM hospital, Dhaka, Bangladesh.
