= Hashibur Rahman Swapon =

Bangladeshi politician (1954–2021)

- মোঃ হাসিবুর রহমান স্বপন

Member of Parliament for Sirajganj-6
- In office 29 January 2014 – 2 September 2021
- Preceded by: Choyon Islam
- Succeeded by: Merina Jahan Kabita

Member of Parliament for Sirajganj-7
- In office 14 July 1996 – 1998
- Preceded by: Kamruddin Ahia Khan Majlish
- Succeeded by: Choyon Islam

Deputy Minister of Industry
- In office 1998–2001

Personal details
- Born: 16 May 1954 Sirajganj, East Bengal, Pakistan
- Died: 2 September 2021 (aged 67) Istanbul, Turkey
- Cause of death: COVID-19
- Party: Bangladesh Nationalist Party; Bangladesh Awami League

Hashibur Rahman Swapon (16 May 1954 – 2 September 2021) was a Bangladesh Awami League politician who served as Jatiya Sangsad member from the Sirajganj-6 and Sirajganj-7 constituencies.

== Early life and education ==
Swapon was born on 16 June 1954, in Dwariyapur in Shahjadpur upazila of Sirajganj district. Swapon had studied up to H.S.C. or grade 12.

== Career ==
Swapon was first elected to Jatiya Sangsad as a member of the Bangladesh Nationalist Party representing the now-defunct Sirajganj-7 constituency. He lost the position when he switched to Awami League party in 1998.

Swapon was later elected to the parliament from Sirajganj-6 on 5 January 2014 as an Awami League candidate. He was a member of the Parliamentary Standing Committee on Food Ministry.

== Death ==
Swapon died from COVID-19 at a hospital in Turkey on 2 September 2021.
