= Rabindra University, Bangladesh =

Public university in Bangladesh

- রবীন্দ্র বিশ্ববিদ্যালয়, বাংলাদেশ
- Type: Public university
- Established: 2017; 9 years ago
- Chancellor: President Mirza Fakhrul Islam Alamgir
- Vice-Chancellor: Tahmina Akhtar
- Location: Shahjadpur Upazila, Sirajganj, Bangladesh; 24.1746°N 89.5940°E
- Website: rub.ac.bd

Rabindra University, Bangladesh (Bengali: রবীন্দ্র বিশ্ববিদ্যালয়, বাংলাদেশ) is a public university in Bangladesh, established in 2017.

== Administration ==
Vice-chancellors

- Bishwajit Ghosh (June 2017 – June 2021)
- Md. Shah Azam (December 2021 – August 2024)
- S. M. Hassan Talukder (September 2024 – 7 June 2026)
- Tahmina Akhtar (8 June 2026–present)

Pro-vice chancellors

- Sumon Kanti Barua (October 2024–present)

== Academics ==
The university's five departments are organised into four faculties.

Faculty	Department	Seat
Faculty of Arts	Bangla	50
Faculty of Social Science	Economics	50
Faculty of Social Science	Sociology	50
Faculty of Business Studies	Management Studies	50
Faculty of Drama and Music	Music	25
