= Makhdum Shah =

Bengalese Sufi Muslim figure

Makhdum Shah Daulah Shahid
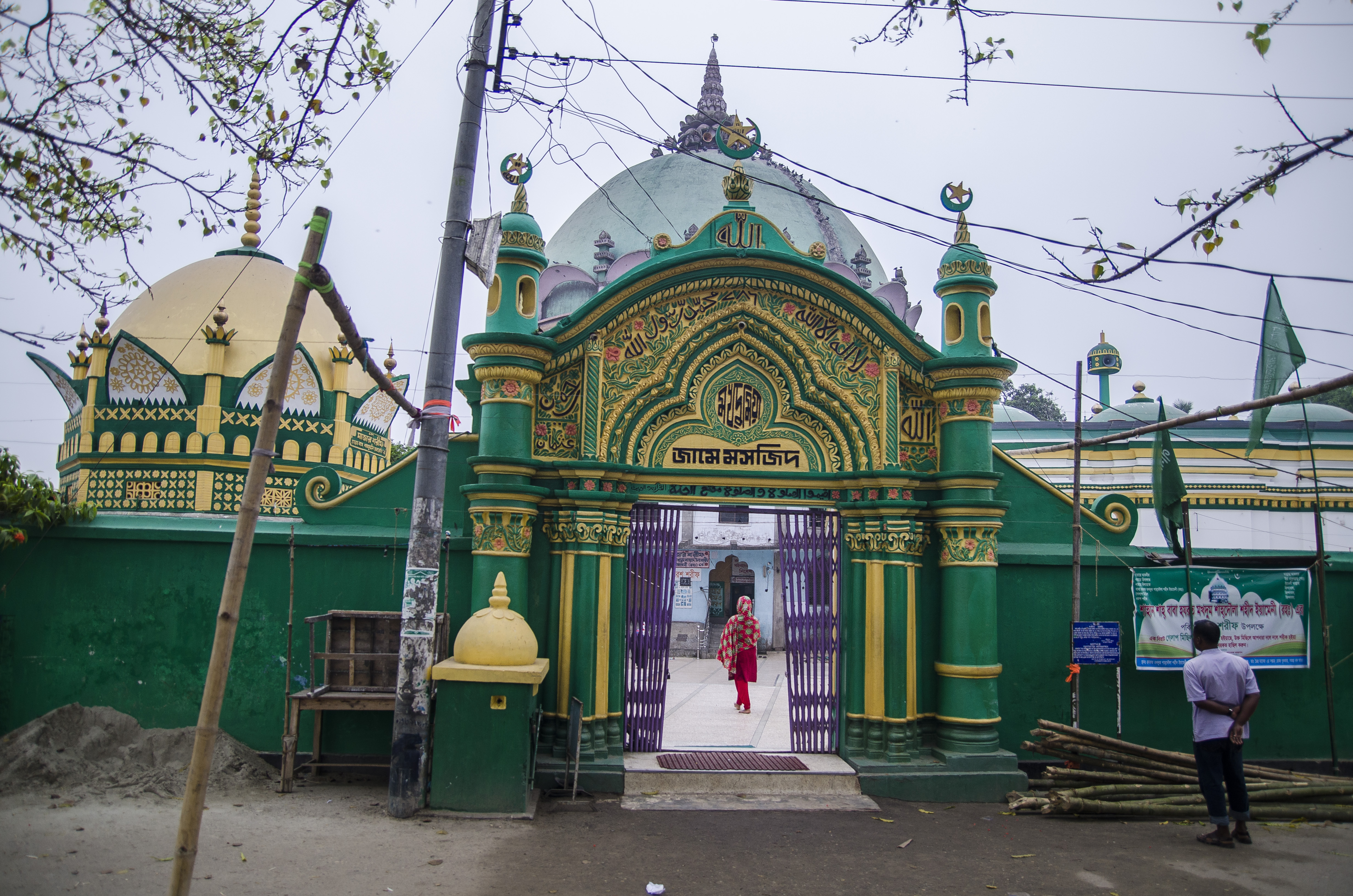
- Dargah of Makhdum Shah Daulah

Personal life
- Born: 13th-century Middle East
- Died: 1313 CE Shahzadpur
- Resting place: Shah Makhdum Mazar, Shahzadpur, Sirajganj District, Bangladesh

Religious life
- Religion: Islam
- Denomination: Sunni
- Philosophy: Sufism
- Lineage: Muadh ibn Jabal

Muslim leader
- Based in: Shahzadpur
- Influenced by: Jalaluddin Surkh-Posh Bukhari

Makhdum Shah Daulah (Arabic: مخدوم شاه دولة, Bengali: মখদূম শাহ দৌলা) was a celebrated Sufi Muslim figure of Bengal. He is associated with the spread of Islam into the Sirajganj District, part of a long history of interactions between the Middle East, Central Asia, and South Asia. He was martyred in Shahzadpur (meaning city of the prince), an area named after him.

== Biography ==
Makhdum Shah Daulah was said to have been a descendant of Muadh ibn Jabal, a companion of the Islamic prophet Muhammad who was appointed as a governor in Yemen. His father had two sons and one daughter. Makhdum Shah Daulah was trained in Sufism and with his father's permission, he set off to propagate the teachings of Islam by travelling to other lands. He was accompanied by his sister, three nephews (Khwaja Kalan Danishmand, Khwaja Nur and Khwaja Anwar), twelve disciples and other followers. They eventually reached Bukhara, where he was welcomed by Jalaluddin Surkh-Posh Bukhari who gifted him with a pair of grey pigeons. They continued to travel eastwards, eventually reaching northern Bengal. The area was ruled by a Hindu raja known as Vikrama Keshari and his territory extended as far as Bihar. Keshari was not content with the propagation of Islam in his kingdom. Conflict occurred between the two sides in which Makhdum Shah Daulah was executed by Raja Vikrama Keshari and most of his disciples were martyred. Keshari later repented for his hostility towards the Muslim community and buried their deceased with due solemnity near the Shahzadpur Shahi Mosque. The area was named as Shahzadpur (city of the prince) in his honour.

== Legacy ==
The area of Raja Vikrama Keshari was renamed as Shahzadpur (city of the prince) in honour of Makhdum Shah Daulah. He is buried in a dargah compound, next to many of his followers such as Shah Shamsuddin Tabrezi, Shah Mahmud, Shah Ahmad, Shah Khingar, Hasila Pir, Shah Ajmal and Shah Badla. Another compound was built for others who were martyred in the conflict and is known as Ganj-e-Shahidan. Makhdum Shah Daulah's sister had drowned herself in the nearby river and that area is identified as Sati Bibir Ghat. The subsequent Muslim rulers of Bengal endowed 722 bighas of land for the maintenance of the dargah and mosque in Shahzadpur and it was entrusted to the descendants of Khwaja Nur, who had survived the conflict.
