= Choyon Islam =

Bangladeshi politician

- চয়ন ইসলাম

Member of Parliament
- In office 29 January 2024 – 6 August 2024
- Preceded by: Merina Jahan Kabita
- Succeeded by: M. A. Muhit
- Constituency: Sirajganj-6
- In office 25 January 2009 – 29 January 2014
- Preceded by: Manzur Quader
- Succeeded by: Hashibur Rahman Swapon
- Constituency: Sirajganj-6
- In office 1998 – 13 July 2001
- Preceded by: Hashibur Rahman Swapon
- Succeeded by: M.A. Matin
- Constituency: Sirajganj-7

Personal details
- Born: 16 November 1961 (age 65)
- Party: Bangladesh Awami League
- Spouse: Lily Islam
- Parent: Mazharul Islam (father)
- Relatives: Merina Jahan Kabita (sister)
- Education: Rabindra Bharati University
- Occupation: Businessman, politician

Choyon Islam (born 16 November 1961) is a Bangladesh Awami League politician and a former Jatiya Sangsad member representing the Sirajganj-6 constituency.

== Career ==
Choyon Islam was elected to parliament from Sirajganj-6 as a Bangladesh Awami League candidate in 2008. He was made a member of the Parliamentary Standing Committee on Jute and Textile Ministry.

Choyon became a member of parliament for the third time after winning the Sirajganj-6 constituency in the 2024 general election as an Awami League-nominated candidate. After the fall of the Sheikh Hasina-led Awami League government, he was arrested from Gazipur on 10 February 2024.

== Personal life ==
Choyon's brother Mostajirul Shovon Islam is married to Shama Obaed, daughter of Bangladesh Nationalist Party politician Obaidur Rahman.
