= Bangladesh Jamaat-e-Islami =

Political party in Bangladesh

Bangladesh Jamaat-e-Islami বাংলাদেশ জামায়াতে ইসলামী
- Abbreviation: Jamaat-e-Islami (formal); Jamaat (informal); BJI (informal)
- Emir: Shafiqur Rahman
- Secretary-General: Miya Ghulam Parwar
- Spokesperson: Mohammed Motiur Rahman Akanda
- Founder: Abbas Ali Khan
- Founded: 27 May 1979; 47 years ago
- Split from: Jamaat-e-Islami Pakistan
- Preceded by: Islamic Democratic League
- Headquarters: 505, Elephant Road, Mogbazar, Dhaka
- Newspaper: Daily Sangram; Daily Naya Diganta; Weekly Sonar Bangla
- Student wing: Bangladesh Islami Chhatra Shibir (Note: de facto affiliation, de jure independent organization); Bangladesh Islami Chhatri Sangstha
- Women's wing: Bangladesh Jamaat-e-Islami Women's Wing
- Trade union: Bangladesh Sramik Kallyan Federation
- Farmer's wing: Bangladesh Chashi Kallyan Samity
- Ideology: Islamism; Conservatism (Bangladeshi); Neo-Islamism; Reformism
- Political position: Right-wing to far-right
- National affiliation: 11 Party Alliance Former: Four Party Alliance; (1999–2012); 20 Party Alliance; (2012–2022)
- International affiliation: Jamaat-e-Islami
- Colors: Light green
- Slogan: আল্লাহর আইন চাই, সৎ লোকের শাসন চাই ("Need divine law, need honest people's governance")
- Jatiya Sangsad: 76 / 350
- Mayors: 0 / 1 (Note: Except Chattogram, mayoral post has been dissolved in all other city corporations of the country)
- Councillors: Post dissolved
- District councils: Post dissolved
- Subdistrict councils: Post dissolved
- Union councils: Post dissolved
- Municipalities: Post dissolved

Election symbol
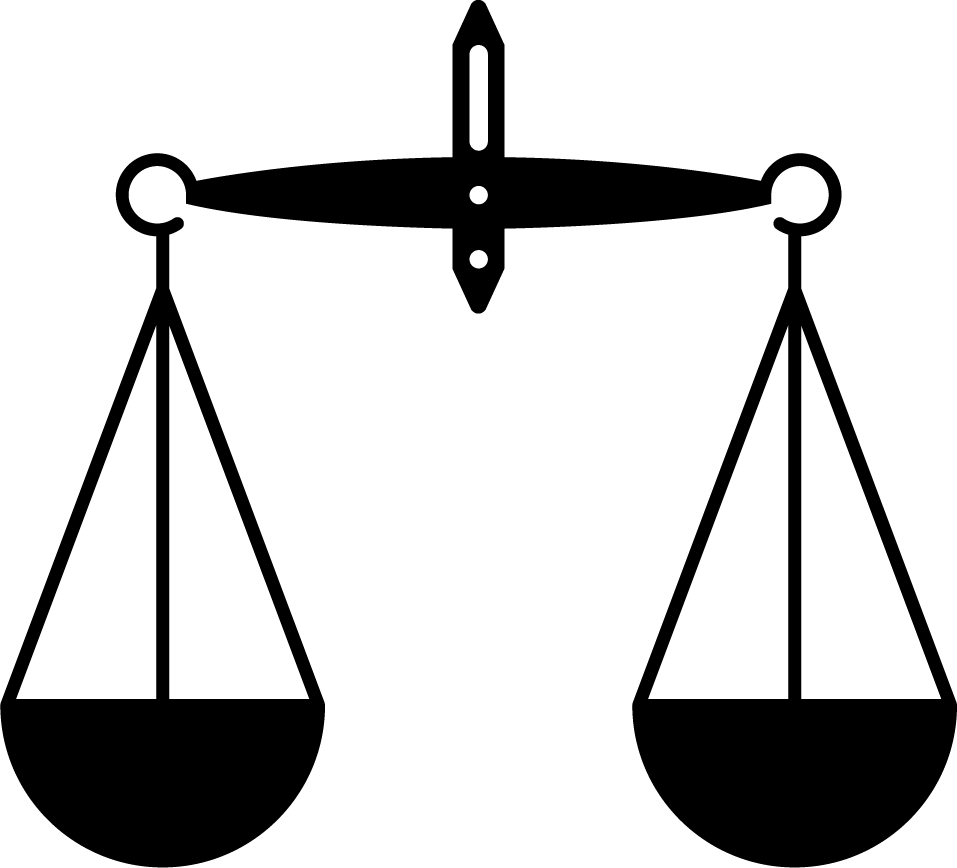
- Pan balance

Party flag

Website
- jamaat-e-islami.org

Bangladesh Jamaat-e-Islami (Note: Bengali: বাংলাদেশ জামায়াতে ইসলামী, romanized: Bāṅlādēś Jāmāẏātē Islāmī, lit. 'Bangladesh Islamic Congress', pronounced [ˈbaŋlaˌdeʃ ˈdʒamaːte ˈisˌlaːmiː]; known as Jamaat-e-Islami Bangladesh until 2008.) is a major right-wing to far-right political party in Bangladesh. It emerged from the East Pakistani wing of the Jamaat-e-Islami Pakistan (JIP) in 1979. A part of the Islamist movement Jamaat-e-Islami, it is the largest Islamist political party in the country, as well as one of the two contemporary mainstream parties, alongside the Bangladesh Nationalist Party (BNP).

The party's origin lies in the original Jamaat-e-Islami organization founded by Sayyid Abul A'la Maududi in 1941 in British India. Jamaat's predecessor, the JIP, though actively participating in the pro-democracy movements of East Pakistan, opposed the independence of Bangladesh and supported Pakistani Forces in the Liberation War in 1971. It reportedly organized several pro-Pakistan groups, and participated in the genocide and other mass atrocities. After a period of post-independence ban on religion-based parties between 1972 and 1976, local members of the JIP merged with several other parties to form the Islamic Democratic League (IDL) in ahead of the general election. In 1979, the IDL was dissolved and the members of the erstwhile East Pakistan JIP reconvened to form the modern-day Bangladesh Jamaat-e-Islami.

The Jamaat played crucial roles in the 1990 mass uprising, 1995 pro-caretaker government movement and 2024 July Uprising. Two of its leaders served in the BNP's coalition government between 2001 and 2006. However, between 2009 and 2024, leaders of the party were prosecuted for war crimes of 1971, its registration was cancelled and was eventually banned. Following the July Uprising, the ban was lifted and its registration was reinstated. Since 2026, it has been the main opposition to the BNP-led government in the Jatiya Sangsad.

Today, Jamaat's politics differ to the Maududi's vision for a totalitarian Islamic state, as it has since sought to portray itself moderate and centrist. The party supports a welfarist economy, and runs charity programmes. The party is controversial for its role in the Liberation War, ideological links to Islamic extremism, human rights abuses, and contradictory positions on women and sharia. As of 2026, Jamaat's strongest demographics include younger and educated people and socially conservative women.

Shafiqur Rahman has been serving as the emir (leader) and Miya Ghulam Parwar has been serving as the secretary-general of the party since 2019. The party maintains a network of affiliated organizations, including the Bangladesh Islami Chhatra Shibir.

== History ==
=== Origins ===
The origin of modern Bangladesh Jamaat-e-Islami party lies in the historical Jamaat-e-Islami movement, founded by Maulana Sayyid Abul A'la Maududi during the British Raj. The movement was established under the name of "Jamaat-e-Islami Hind" at Islamia Park, Lahore on 26 August 1941, as an "organizational platform" for promoting Maududi's vision of an Islamic state. Maududi was deeply concerned about the perceived decline of religious values due to the impact of Western secular ideologies on Muslim communities in India. Thus, he envisioned the Jamaat to be more than a political party – a "comprehensive Islamic movement" influencing all aspects of life through activities in social welfare, education, and political activism. Though the movement's stated goal was to promote social and political Islam, many analysts think that it was mainly formed from as an anti-communist force, which received favour from the British rulers.

Initially, Jamaat-e-Islami opposed the creation of a separate state of Pakistan for the Muslims of India, arguing that concept violated the Islamic doctrine of the ummah. He saw the partition as creating a temporal border that would divide Muslims from one another, while advocating for the whole of India to be reclaimed for Islam. However, Maududi eventually concluded supporting the creation of a Muslim-majority Pakistan as an opportunity to establish his envisioned Islamic state.

After the creation of Pakistan, Jamaat-e-Islami divided into separate Indian and Pakistani national organisations. When East Pakistan became independent as Bangladesh, the East Pakistan wing split out of the Jamaat-e-Islami Pakistan and became Jamaat-e-Islami Bangladesh.

=== In East Pakistan (1955–1971) ===
Following the establishment of Pakistan, significant imbalance emerged between the eastern and the western wings of the country. The East Bengal (later East Pakistan) remained structurally disadvantaged comparing to its western counterpart, in terms of both political and economic conditions. This also contributed to regional fractionalization of the party. For example, East Bengal chapter of Jamaat supported the Bengali Language Movement in 1952, which was opposed by the central party in West Pakistan as they classified it as "calls for a greater role for Bengali identity in the State".

Though initially favouring martial law, the East Pakistan Jamaat-e-Islami participated in the democratic movement against president Ayub Khan following his government's family laws, which they deemed as un-Islamic. Emir of Jamaat-e-Islami East Pakistan branch Ghulam Azam was a member of the all-party democratic alliance was formed in 1965 against Khan's rule, which also included Maulana Abdul Hamid Khan Bhashani and Bangabandhu Sheikh Mujibur Rahman.

During the late 1960s, Jamaat‑e‑Islami strongly resisted the rising socialist programs promoted by leaders such as Zulfikar Ali Bhutto in West Pakistan and Bhashani in East Pakistan. The party actively campaigned against these agendas, organized a large coalition of Islamic scholars and clerics, over a hundred ulema, who issued statements denouncing the Pakistan Peoples Party's socialism as "atheistic" and "anti‑Islam".

As the Six-Point Movement gained momentum in East Pakistan from 1966 onwards, Jamaat-e-Islami adopted a firm stance against it. The Six-Point Movement, put forth by the Awami League, demanded for extensive autonomy for East Pakistan and was viewed by Bengali nationalists as a charter for self-rule. The party viewed the movement as a divisive, secessionist agenda that threatened the solidarity of the Muslim nation and the integrity of Pakistan, as Jamaat-e-Islami's pan-Islamist ideology emphasized the unity of the country based on Islamic principles.

In the 1970 general election, Jamaat failed to gain any National Assembly seat from East Pakistan.

==== Bangladesh Liberation War (1971) ====
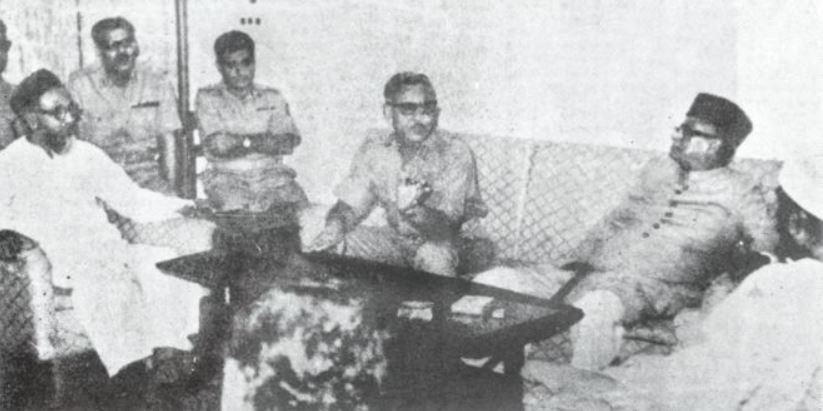
Ghulam Azam, leader of the East Pakistan Jamaat, meeting with the Governor of East Pakistan Tikka Khan, 4 April 1971

In 1971, Jamaat-e-Islami Pakistan opposed the independence of Bangladesh and the dismemberment of Pakistan. Ghulam Azam, then head of Jamaat-e-Islami East Pakistan, delivered several speeches after 25 March 1971, excerpts of which were regularly published in the party's mouthpiece, The Daily Sangram. On 30 June in Lahore, while speaking to journalists, Azam stated that his party was making every effort to suppress what he described as the activities of "miscreants" in East Pakistan, and that many Jamaat workers had been killed by these elements as a result of their efforts.

The party actively supported the military intervention in East Pakistan and participated in a variety of human rights abuses against the civilian population of the region. It played a key role in organizing pro‑Pakistan collaborationist bodies. On 4 April 1971, twelve pro‑Pakistan leaders, including Nurul Amin, Azam, and Syed Khwaja Khairuddin, met General Tikka Khan of the Pakistan Army and assured him of their cooperation in suppressing the independence movement. Following a series of meetings, they announced the formation of the East Pakistan Central Peace Committee, which initially included 140 members, among them 96 Jamaat‑e‑Islami members who began training at an Ansar camp on Khanjahan Ali Road in Khulna. The committee was also alleged to have been involved in recruiting Razakar paramilitaries to assist the Pakistan Army.

On 12 October 1971, President Yahya Khan declared that elections would take place between 25 November and 9 December. Jamaat‑e‑Islami East Pakistan decided that the party would participate in the local elections. According to a government declaration issued on 2 November, 53 candidates were to be elected without contest, and Jamaat‑e‑Islami secured 14 of these uncontested seats.

On 2 December 1971, according to a report in The Daily Ittefaq, Azam held a one‑hour and ten‑minute meeting with President Khan in Rawalpindi. After the meeting, Azam addressed a press conference where he urged the public to give their full support to the armed forces in dealing with the ongoing crisis. He again described the Mukti Bahini as an enemy force and stated that the Razakars were sufficient to confront them, further calling for an increase in the number of Razakars.

=== In Bangladesh (1971–present) ===
==== Ban (1972–1976) ====
Following the independence of Bangladesh, religion-based politics was banned by the government of Sheikh Mujibur Rahman, then-prime minister of Bangladesh. Jamaat's top leaders fled to Pakistan, and Ghulam Azam's citizenship was scrapped by the Bangladeshi government. Azam first fled to Pakistan and organized "East Pakistan Recovery Week". As information about his participation in the killing of civilians came to light "a strong groundswell of resentment against" East Pakistan JI leadership developed and Azam and Maulana Abdur Rahim were sent to Saudi Arabia. In Saudi Arabia, Azam and some of his followers successfully appealed for donations to "defend Islam" in Bangladesh, asserting that the ruling government was undermining Islam by imposing secularism and socialism, and the Hindu minority there were "killing Muslims and burning their homes." Many of the Jamaat-aligned leaders in Bangladesh, hiding their identity, mixed with then-active opposition groups in Bangladesh, such as the Jatiya Samajtantrik Dal.

==== Rehabilitation (1976–1991) ====
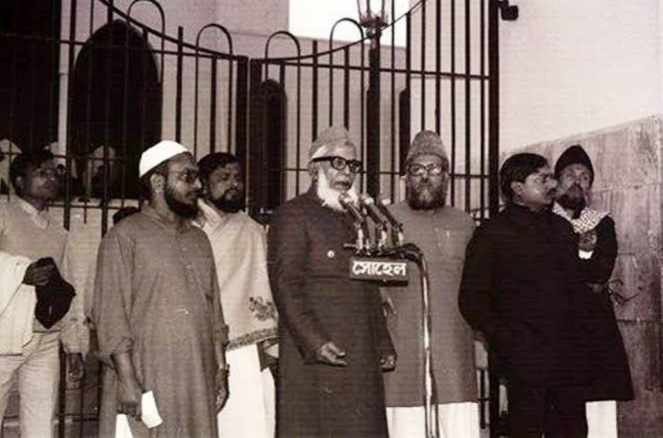
Abbas Ali Khan, the acting emir of the Jamaat, speaking in a rally at Baitul Mukarram, 1980s

In 1975, Sheikh Mujibur Rahman was assassinated by a group of officers of Bangladesh Army, which resulted a drastic change in Bangladeshi politics. Post-Mujibur governments were immediately recognized by both Saudi Arabia and Pakistan, and Jamaat-e-Islami resumed political activities in Bangladesh. Following the Sipahi–Janata Revolution of November 1975, Bangladesh's de facto military leader and later president Major General Ziaur Rahman actively pushed for the Islamization in the country.

On 4 May 1976, president ASM Sayem issued the Proclamation Order III that abolished the Article 38 of the constitution. The article prohibited the formation of political parties or groupings based on religious orientation. Abolition of the article allowed religiously motivated political groups to participate in the elections, paving the way for the return of groups like the Muslim League, Jamaat-e-Islami & Nizam-e-Islam previously banned for their opposition to the Liberation War.

In 1976, Jamaat-aligned leaders, uniting with some other Islamist parties, formed a political platform named Islamic Democratic League (IDL). According to Jamaat's own website, six Jamaat-aligned leaders were elected to the Jatiya Sangsad in 1979 general election from this platform. President Ziaur Rahman also allowed Azam to return to Bangladesh as the leader of Jamaat-e-Islami.

In May 1979, Abbas Ali Khan presided a convention of Jamaat-aligned IDL leaders under the name of "Jamaat-e-Islami". At the convention, Azam's speech was read out for the first time in independent Bangladesh. Jamaat's new constitution and the party's four-point programme was approved in the convention. On 27 May 1979, Jamaat-e-Islami Bangladesh publicly appeared and officially revealed itself in Bangladesh. Azam was elected as the emir of the party, but did not appear in public until 1981. As he wasn't given citizenship of Bangladesh until 1991, Khan served as the acting leader of the party.

Jamaat actively participed in the anti-Ershad movements throughout the 1980s. It participated in the 1986 general election and secured 10 seats, and boycotted the 1988 general election. However, unlike most other anti-Ershad opposition parties, the Jamaat didn't opposed the Eighth Amendment Bill that declared Islam as the state religion of Bangladesh in 1988.

==== Entry into mainstream politics (1991–2013) ====
Between 1991 and 2007, two secular political parties in Bangladesh, the Awami League (AL) and Bangladesh Nationalist Party (BNP), established strategic partnerships with the Jamaat. Previously, both had sought assistance from the party to set up a government or accelerate political movements for overthrowing the dictatorship. The alliances were primarily driven by the political advantage and "recognition of Islam's increasing significance among Muslim voters".

After the end of Ershad's regime in 1990, Jamaat participated in the 1991 general election and secured 18 seats. The BNP, which won most seats, needed legislative support from a party to form government. Jamaat extended support to the party on the condition of providing Azam with Bangladeshi citizenship. In 1992, however, mass protests began against Azam and Jamaat. The protests were headed by Jahanara Imam, an author who lost her elder son, Shafi Imam Rumi in the Bangladesh War of Independence. Azam's citizenship was challenged in a case that went to the Bangladesh Supreme Court, as he only held a Pakistani passport. Absent prosecution of Azam for war crimes, the Supreme Court ruled that he had to be allowed to have a Bangladeshi passport and the freedom to resume his political activities.

From 1995, Jamaat allied with the AL and protested against the BNP government in support of the caretaker government system. The party boycotted the February 1996 general election. Later, in the June 1996 general election, which held under the caretaker government, Jamaat secured only three seats.

In 1998, the Jamaat for the first time agreed to join in a formal alliance with the BNP, despite having ideological differences with the party (Bangladeshi nationalism and Islamism). The BNP, Jamaat, Jatiya Party (Ershad) and the Jatiya Party (Naziur) united to form the Four Party Alliance in 1999. The alliance got landslide victory in the 2001 general election, along with Jamaat got 17 seats. Following the election, the party got first chance to join a coalition government, and two of its senior leaders, Motiur Rahman Nizami and Ali Ahsan Mohammad Mojaheed, the emir and the secretary-general respectively, became ministers in the cabinet of Khaleda Zia. During its alliance with the BNP, the Jamaat decisively contributed to the gradual Islamization in the country.

During the 2006–08 political crisis, police arrested Jamaat chief and former Industry Minister Nizami from his home in a graft case on 19 May 2008. Earlier, two former cabinet ministers of the immediate past BNP-Jamaat led coalition government, Abdul Mannan Bhuiyan and Shamsul Islam were sent to Dhaka Central Jail, after they surrendered before the court.

In 2008 general election, the party only received two seats as a part of the alliance. The BNP was concerned as Jamaat had been their primary political partner in the Four-Party Alliance. At the same year, the party had to change its name from "Jamaat-e-Islami Bangladesh" to "Bangladesh Jamaat-e-Islami" on the pressure of the Bangladesh Election Commission. Meanwhile, by the time, it already had emerged as the largest Islamist party in the country.

==== Prosecution, deregistration and ban (2013–2024) ====
After Awami League formed government, it started to prosecute war crimes in the Liberation War. In 2011, the International Crimes Tribunal (ICT) was formed for the prosecution of war crimes. Many of the Jamaat's top leaders were jailed and executed on the verdict of ICT. In December 2013, Jamaat leader Abdul Quader Mollah was executed for the war crimes. In 2014, Ghulam Azam died in prison. In 2015 and 2016, Mojaheed and Nizami were executed for war crimes, respectively. The detainment and execution of top leaders made the party functionally weak. While international observers, including the Office of the High Commissioner for Human Rights, raised suspicions concerning the fairness of the trials, which targeted the ruling party's political opponents, the verdicts enjoyed widespread societal support. The condemnation of Mollah was the key motivation for the Shahbag Movement in 2013, which demanded Mollah's execution, ban on Jamaat, and boycott of affiliated organizations.

However, the trial also received counter protests from Bangladesh Islami Chhatra Shibir, the male student wing of Jamaat. In February 2013, following the verdict by the ICT and the announcement of death sentence of Delwar Hossain Sayeedi, a leader of Jamaat-e-Islami, supporters of Jamaat and Shibir were involved in anti-Hindu violence; law enforcement killed 44 protesters and wounded 250. More than 50 temples were damaged, and more than 1,500 houses and business establishments of Hindus were torched in Gaibandha, Chittagong, Rangpur, Sylhet, Chapainawabganj, Bogra and in many other districts of the country, (Note: Multiple references:) By March 2013, more than 87 people had been killed by law enforcement agencies. During the violence, Jamaat-e-Islami supporters called for the fall of the Awami League regime.

On 27 January 2009, the Supreme Court issued a ruling after 25 people from different Islamic organisations, including Bangladesh Tarikat Federation's Secretary General Syed Rezaul Haque Chandpuri, Zaker Party's Secretary General Munshi Abdul Latif and Sammilita Islami Jote's President Maulana Ziaul Hasan, filed a joint petition. Jamaat-e-Islami chief Nizami, Secretary Mojaheed and the Election Commission Secretary were given six weeks time to reply, but they did not. The ruling asked to explain "why the Jamaat's registration should not be declared illegal". As a verdict of the ruling, High Court cancelled the registration of the Jamaat-e-Islami on 1 August 2013, ruling that the party is unfit to contest national polls because its charter puts Allah above democratic process. (Note: Multiple references:) On 5 August 2013, the Supreme Court rejected Jamaat's plea against the High Court. From that time, Jamaat became virtually absent from the mainstream politics.

Following the cancellation of registration, the party could not participated in 2014, 2018 and 2024 general elections. Some of its leaders contested in the 2018 election from BNP's ticket, but could not secure any seats. The party boycotted the 2014 and 2024 elections.

The Jamaat-e-Islami and its student wing Shibir extended their support and actively participated in the July Uprising in 2024. On this pretext, Sheikh Hasina's regime banned the party on 1 August 2024. (Note: Multiple references:)

==== Resurgence (2024–present) ====
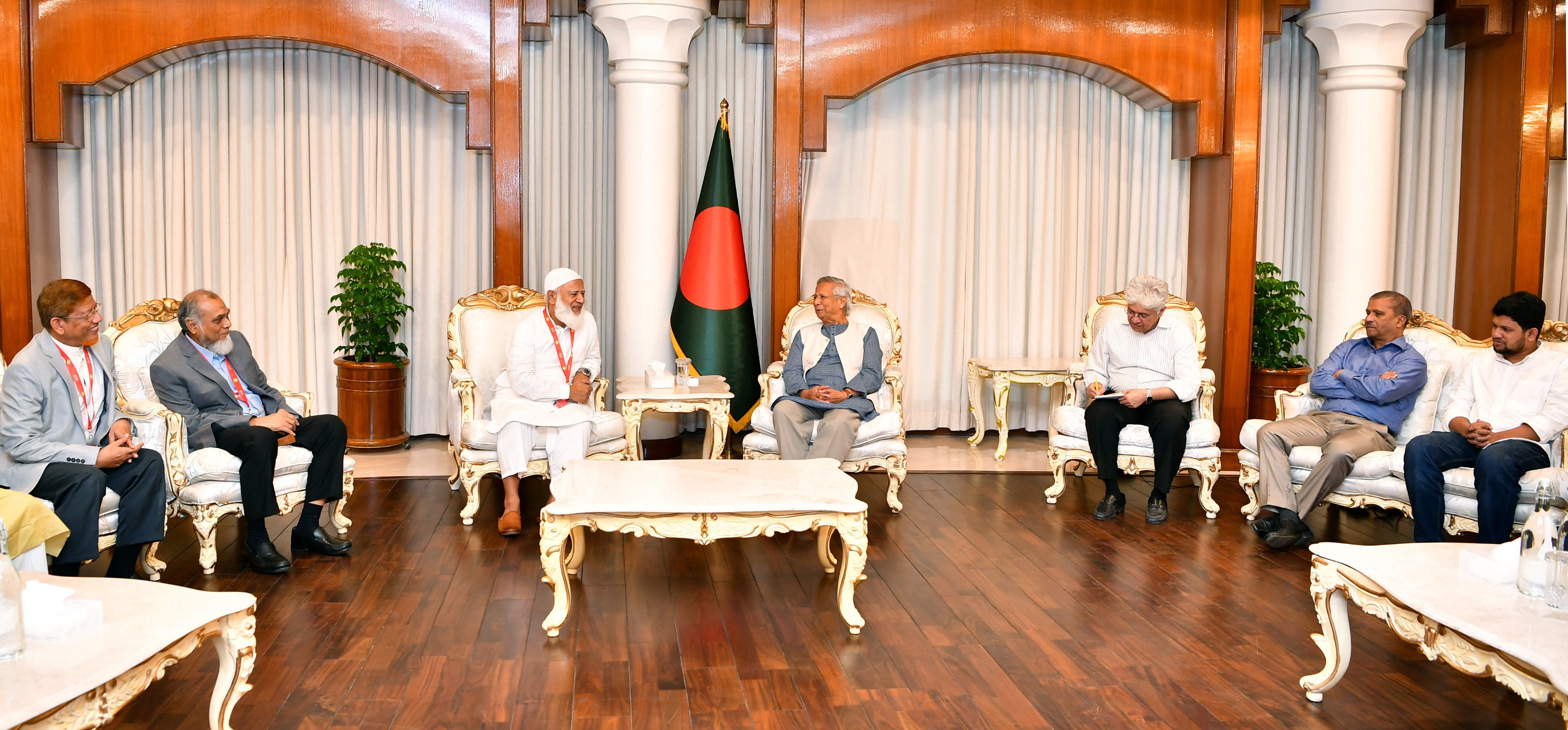
Jamaat delegation led by Shafiqur Rahman meeting with the chief adviser Muhammad Yunus, 28 November 2024

Following the Resignation of Sheikh Hasina, the ban was reversed by the interim government on 28 August 2024. Bangladesh Jamaat-e-Islami also regained registration after an order by the Appellate Division of the Bangladesh Supreme Court on 1 June 2025.

Following the July Uprising, with BNP, it came out as one of the two mainstream parties in the country. It formed 11 Party Alliance with several Islamist parties and the National Citizen Party. The party secured 68 seats in 2026 general election, and became the main opposition for the first time.

In July 2026, Hefazat-e-Islam Bangladesh, the largest qawmi madrasa-based Islamic advocacy group in Bangladesh, expressed concern over the en masse joining of qawmi madrasa students in Jamaat, as they consider Jamaat not upholding their version of aqidah.

== Ideology ==
=== Political stance ===
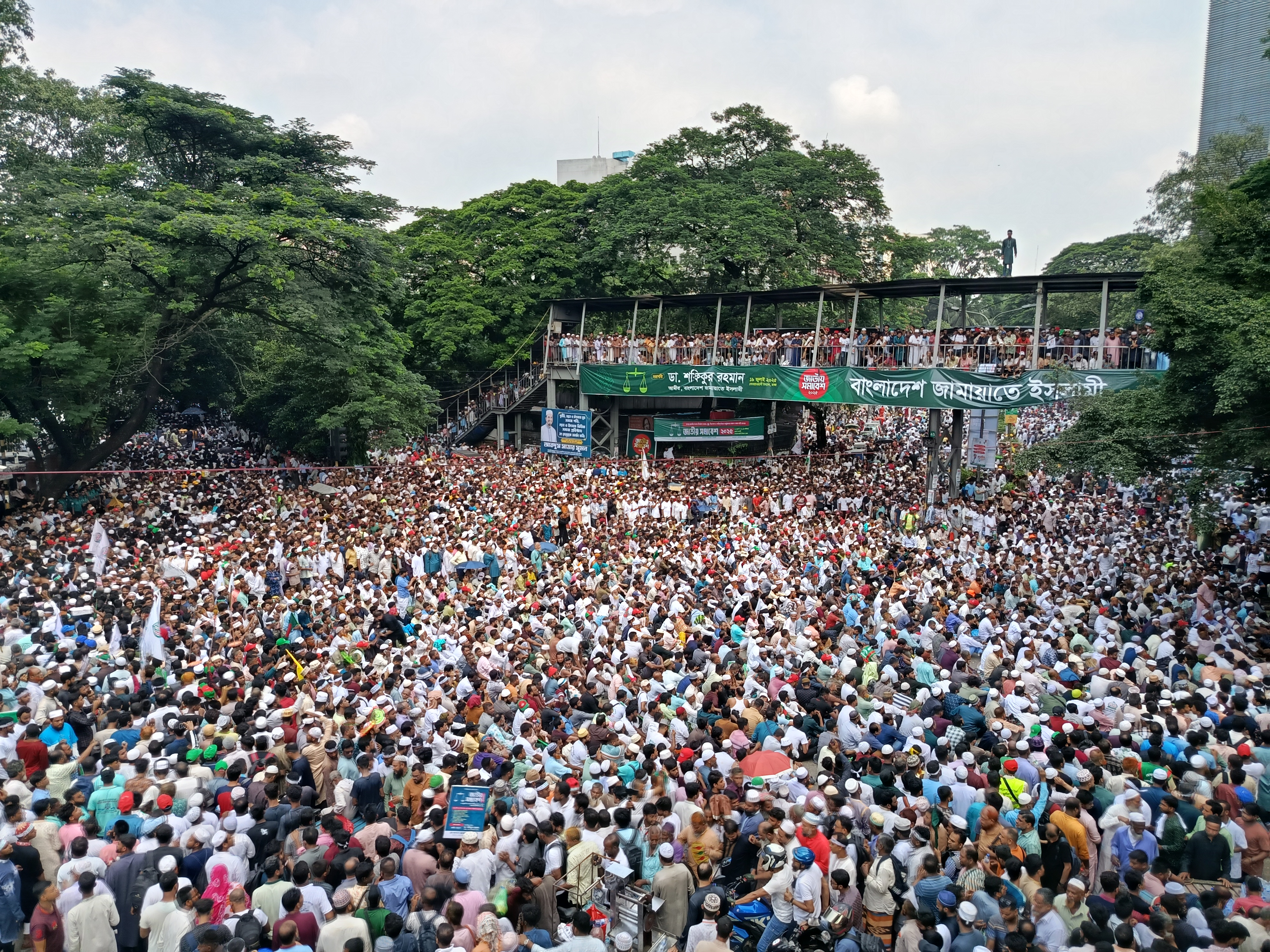
Jamaat's rally at Suhrawardy Udyan demanding proportional representation, 2025

Jamaat leaders and publications have variously described their party as "modern liberal democratic", "Muslim democrats", "progressive and centrist Islamic" and "moderate Islamist". Although third-party independent sources have classified it as right-wing to far-right in the left-right spectrum. Apart from being Islamist, the party has also been described as conservative, neo-Islamist, and reformist. In recent times, however, according to AKM Waresul Islam, professor at North South University, Jamaat has attempted to reposition itself from being a conservative right-wing party to a centre-right party.

Originally, Jamaat-e-Islami's founder Sayyid Abul A'la Maududi developed the idea of "theo-democracy", a combination of democracy and theocracy whereby the state operates in full accordance with Islamic law in all aspects of life. He criticized both the popular sovereignty as contradictory to ḥākimīyah (sovereignty of the God) and the European style-theocracy where power is bestowed to the clergies, rather envisioned an ideal state that is ruled by the entire Muslim community in accordance with sharia. In Maududi's envisioned sharia-based totalitarian state, inspired by the Benito Mussolini's Fascist Party and the Communist Party of the Soviet Union, democracy, freedom, individualism, and equal rights for people would be non-existent, and all non-Muslims would enjoy "inferior" rights as Dhimmis, obligated to pay jizya. However, Bangladesh Jamaat-e-Islami's present "neo-Islamist" politics might differ Maududi's visions.

In 2012, Jamaat had to amend some fundamental principles of its constitution to meet the conditions for the registration of parties set by the Election Commission, as the previous version allegedly conflicted to the "democratic and noncommunal structure" of the Constitution of Bangladesh and Representation of the People Order, 1972. After the amendments, the party replaced the establishment of an "Islamic system" with the "democratic system" as its stated goal. Likewise, "efforts to establish Islam as given by Allah and shown by the Messenger" was replaced with "to establish a society based on equality and justice through a democratic system and to achieve the pleasure of Allah Almighty" as main objective.

Following the execution and imprisonment of senior leaders convicted of involvement in the 1971 genocide, Jamaat experienced internal fragmentation. The reformist factions proposed ideological moderation and democratic participation, while hardliners insisted on maintaining traditional Islamist aims. Multiple splinter groups emerged, some more radical, some abandoning formal politics.

=== Social stance ===
In recent times, the party has become open on female-related issues, such as right to work outside and freedom of clothing. Similarly, the party also expressed support to the rights of religious minorities and protection of their properties. The party also retracted from its stated goal of the establishment of a sharia-based state, and focused on the creation of an "honest people's government". Despite these initiatives, the party still officially rejects female leadership and continues to uphold its traditional philosophy of introducing sharia through "electoral process".

Under Shafiqur Rahman's leadership, the party has attracted a wide range of politicians, religious minorities and the freedom fighters. Additional secretary-general of the party Mahbub Zubayer claimed that there were "hundreds of thousands" of freedom fighters within Jamaat, a claim which is difficult to verify independently. However, there are two gazetted freedom fighters who were elected as the Member of Parliament in 2026 — Md. Abdul Wares for Gaibandha-5 and Gazi Nazrul Islam for Satkhira-4.

=== Economic stance ===
Maududi was a staunch critic of capitalism. According to a Jamaat publication titled An Introduction to Bangladesh Jamaate Islami, the party aims to turn Bangladesh into an "Islamic welfare state". It also runs charities that provide religious, social, food, and medical services at the local level, which helped the party build a strong network at the grassroots. However, political scientist Maidul Islam argued that Jamaat's claim of opposing capitalism is "a false claim", stating that the party strongly defends private property rights, profit, and rent, and proposes an "interest-free welfare capitalist model" that aligns with "the logic of capitalism". Analysing the party's election manifestoes before 2012, he concluded that Jamaat's economic position is essentially neoliberal, which favours privatization, economic liberalism, and banking sector reforms.

Since the party's resurgence following the July Uprising, the party has focused on welfarist issues like social justice and anti-corruption. The party supports extensive tax cuts, reducing VAT, interest-free loans and public–private ownership for factories with workers' ownership. Shafi Md Mostofa claimed that the party is rebranding itself in the aftermath of the July Uprising by positioning itself within the "Islamic left".

=== Voter base ===
Following the July Uprising, surveys show that the Jamaat's strongest demographic base are younger and more educated voters, who are likely to be impressed by the perceived discipline and integrity of the party. Likewise, socially conservative women also favour the party. According to David Bergman, voters who are primarily concerned to the perceived Indian influence in Bangladesh, are also likely to vote for the party.

A June 2025 conducted survey by the South Asian Network on Economic Modeling (SANEM) on the Bangladeshis aged between 15 and 35 found that the Jamaat's projected vote share was comparatively high among the young males, comparing with the young females of the country. The survey found that 22.21% males and 20.57% females intended to vote the party in 2026 general election. The survey also found that 21.45% youths overall in the country intended to vote the party.

== Organization ==
The party has a three-level decision-making body – Central Executive Council, Central Majlis-e-Shura and Central Working Council. Executive Council is the highest organ of the party, which is responsible for reviewing and executing the policies made by the Majlis-e-Shura and the Working Council. As of 2026, there are no women in the Central Executive Council.

=== Leadership ===
==== Emirs ====
The Emir of the Jamaat (Bengali: আমীরে জামায়াত) is the title of the head of the party. The position is de facto preserved for male only. The emir is assisted by a group of deputies known as deputy emirs. As of February 2026, four deputy emirs include A. T. M. Azharul Islam, Mojibur Rahman, Syed Abdullah Mohammad Taher, and A. N. M. Shamsul Islam. Following is the chronological list of emirs since formation of the East Pakistani wing of Jamaat-e-Islami:

No.	Name	Portrait	Tenure	Home District
East Pakistan
1	Abdur Rahim		1956 — 1960	Pirojpur
2	Ghulam Azam		1960 — 1971	Dhaka
Bangladesh
Acting	Abbas Ali Khan		1979 — 1992	Rajshahi
3	Ghulam Azam		1992 — 2000	Dhaka
4	Motiur Rahman Nizami		2000 — 11 May 2016	Pabna
5	Maqbul Ahmed		2016 — 2019	Mymensingh
6	Shafiqur Rahman		2019 — present	Sylhet

==== Secretary Generals ====
The Secretary General of Jamaat (Bengali: জামায়াতের সেক্রেটারি জেনারেল) is the chief administrative officer of the party. The following is the chronological list of Secretaries General since the formation of the East Pakistani wing of Jamaat-e-Islami:

No.	Name	Portrait	Tenure	Home District
East Pakistan
1	Abdur Rahim		1956 — 1960	Pirojpur
2	Khurshid Ahmad		1960 — 1971	Punjab
Bangladesh
3	Abbas Ali Khan		1979 — 1987	Rajshahi
4	Ali Ahsan Mohammad Mojaheed		1987 — 2000	Faridpur
5	Matiur Rahman Nizami		2000 — 2001	Pabna
6	Ali Ahsan Mohammad Mojaheed		2001 — 2008	Faridpur
7	ATM Azharul Islam		2008 — 2011	Rangpur
8	Shafiqur Rahman		2011 — 2019	Sylhet
9	Miya Ghulam Parwar		2019 — present	Khulna

=== Central Executive Council members (2026–28) ===
Source: jamaat-e-islami.org
Designation	Name
Emir (National President)	Shafiqur Rahman
Deputy Emir	ATM Azharul Islam
Deputy Emir	Mujibur Rahman
Deputy Emir	Syed Abdullah Mohammed Taher
Secretary General	Mia Golam Parwar
Assistant Secretary General	A. T. M. Masum
Assistant Secretary General	Rafiqul Islam Khan
Assistant Secretary General	A. H. M. Hamidur Rahman Azad
Assistant Secretary General	Abdul Halim
Assistant Secretary General	Muazzam Hossain Helal
Assistant Secretary General	Muhammad Shahjahan
Assistant Secretary General	Ahsanul Mahboob Zubair
Secretary, Central Publicity Department	Matiur Rahman Akand
Central Executive Council Member	Md. Abdul Rob
Central Executive Council Member	Saiful Alam Khan Milon
Central Executive Council Member	Md. Sahabuddin
Central Executive Council Member	Md. Izzat Ullah
Central Executive Council Member	Mobarak Hossain
Central Executive Council Member	Nurul Islam Bulbul
Central Executive Council Member	Mohammad Selim Uddin
Central Executive Council Member	Shafiqul Islam Masud
Central Executive Council Member	Muhammad Rezaul Karim

== Controversies ==
Bangladesh Jamaat-e-Islami has been the subject of extensive controversy since the country's independence, largely due to its documented opposition to the 1971 Liberation War, convictions of its senior leaders for war crimes, allegations of violent extremism, repeated involvement in political violence, and sustained criticism from human rights groups, international observers, and the Bangladeshi public. According to Ankita Sanyal, though the incumbent party chief Rahman reportedly sought "unconditional apology" multiple times for the mistakes committed since 1947 (including 1971), its leaders continue to indulge in historical negationism related to 1971.

=== Allegations of militant links and ideological extremism ===
Bangladeshi security agencies have repeatedly reported ideological ties between Jamaat, its student wing Islami Chhatra Shibir, and extremist organizations such as Jamaat-ul-Mujahideen Bangladesh (JMB) and Harkat-ul-Jihad al-Islami (HuJI-B). Historically, the Islami Chhatra Shibir has frequently been labeled one of the most violent student organizations in South Asia. Although Jamaat denies institutional ties, extremism investigations have reported overlaps in recruitment patterns, ideological messaging, and activist networks.

=== Violence and human rights abuses ===
Following the war-crime verdict by ICT, Jamaat and Islami Chhatra Shibir engaged in violent street movements, including arson attacks, clashes with police, vandalism, and shutdowns of transportation networks during 2013–14 violence. Jamaat–Shibir activists were widely reported to have engaged in firebombing, destruction of public property, and violent attacks on security forces. Its supporters were accused of murdering opponent political party activists and instigating religious riots by spreading fraudulent news.

Activists from Jamaat and particularly Islami Chhatra Shibir have been implicated in violent attacks, hacking assaults, extortion, and intimidation of rival student groups and journalists. Reports by Human Rights Watch document repeated incidents in which Jamaat–Shibir supporters engaged in election-period violence, intimidation, and attacks on minority communities during political unrest.

=== International condemnation and public perception ===
Jamaat's wartime role and ideological positions have attracted global criticism. Pakistan and Turkey condemned executions of Jamaat leaders, while India supported the war-crimes trials. Western governments expressed due-process concerns but acknowledged the severity of the crimes associated with Jamaat leadership.

Public perception of Jamaat declined sharply after the rise of the Shahbag movement in 2013, in which millions demanded a ban on the party and harsher punishment for convicted war criminals.

=== Contradictory positions ===
According to The Diplomat, the party has been accused of "doublespeak" on minority, women and sharia-related issues. In 2008, the party amended its constitution to include non-Muslims as "associated members" in the pressure of the Election Commission. Yet, full membership or rukon is constitutionally restricted for the non-Muslims, means that the non-Muslims cannot participate in the decision-making, leadership or policy formulation, which challenges the party's claimed so-called "inclusive politics". Besides, its constitution continue to advocate for the implementation of sharia, yet, in recent times, the party's top leaders have shown tendency of avoiding the issue in formal statements. Despite this, such advocacy continue to surface in the grassroots level, and, even, there have been accusations against the party of describing voting as a "religious duty" and linking it to the attainment of paradise.

Although not stated in the constitution, the party de facto bars women from leadership position, arguing religious obligations. This contradictory stance doesn't only come to challenge the Constitution of Bangladesh, but also questions its alignment with the Bangladesh Nationalist Party government between 2001 and 2006 under the female leader Khaleda Zia.

== Affiliated organisations ==
=== Bangladesh Islami Chhatrashibir ===
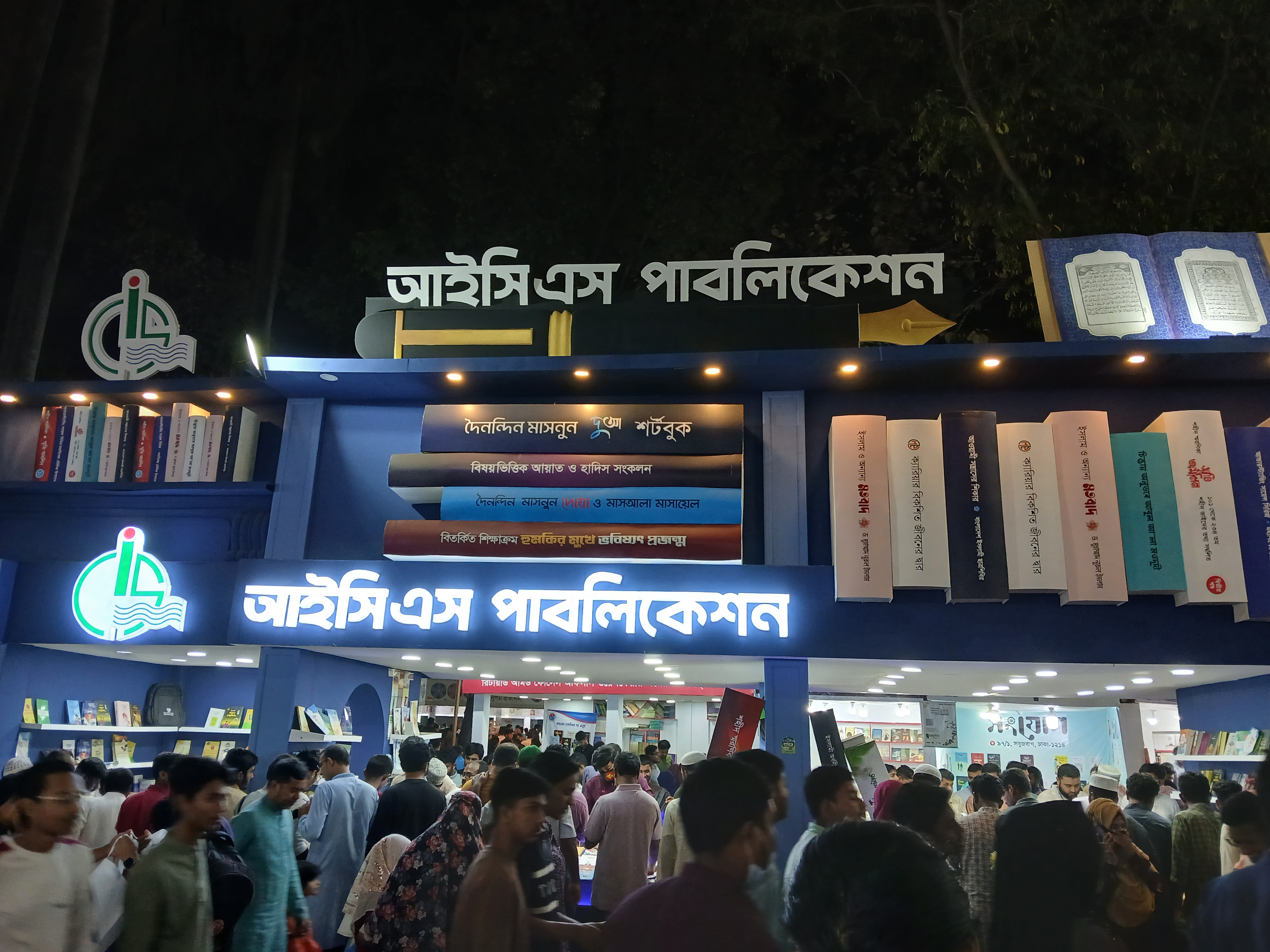
Bangladesh Islami Chhatra Shibir'a book stall at Ekushey Book Fair

Bangladesh Islami Chhatrashibir functions as the male student wing of Bangladesh Jamaat-e-Islami, with numerous former leaders advancing to hold prominent leadership roles within the party. The organisation has significant presence at many colleges and universities of Bangladesh, including the Chittagong College, Government Bangla College, Dhaka College, Government Titumir College, University of Chittagong, University of Dhaka, Rajshahi University, Islamic University, Begum Rokeya University, Carmichael College etc. It is also influential in Madrasahs. It is the successor of East Pakistan Islami Chatra Sangha, the East Pakistani wing of Islami Jamiat-e-Talaba. (Note: Multiple references:) It is a member of the International Islamic Federation of Student organizations and the World Assembly of Muslim Youth.

=== Bangladesh Islami Chhatri Sangstha ===
Bangladesh Islami Chhatri Sangstha functions as the female student wing of Jamaat-e-Islami, being established on 15 July 1978.

=== Bangladesh Chashi Kallyan Samity ===
Bangladesh Chashi Kallyan Samity is a non-governmental organization and peasant wing of Bangladesh Jamaat-e-Islami. It was established in 1977 by Jamaat leader AKM Yusuf. It and other Jamaat-linked NGOs were under pressure due to crackdowns launched under the Awami League regime from 2018 to 2019 and 2024.

=== Bangladesh Mosque Mission ===
Bangladesh Mosque Mission functions as the mosque wing of Bangladesh Jamaat-e-Islami. It is also registered as a social welfare organisation and non-governmental organisation.

Officially established on 25 November 1973, the organisation was registered with the Department of Social Services in 1976.

It also manages three educational institutions:

- Masjid Mission Academy
- Masjid Mission Academy School & College (boys)
- Masjid Mission Academy School & College (girls)

=== Jatiya Muktijoddha Parishad ===
Jatiya Muktijoddha Parishad (Bengali: জাতীয় মুক্তিযোদ্ধা পরিষদ, lit. 'National Freedom Fighters' Council') is the freedom fighters' wing of the Jamaat-e-Islami. According to the party, it was established in 2008 in order to unify the pro-Jamaat freedom fighters when calls to prosecute the war criminals of 1971 were growing. It's currently based on Paltan, Dhaka. Freedom fighters Engr. Moslem Uddin and Md. Tajirul Islam are currently serving as the president and the secretary-general of the organization. According to the party, 70 gazetted freedom fighters are in the central committee of the organization. As of 2026, the organization unregistered by the government and doesn't maintain any website, except a Facebook page, which is largely inactive.

=== National Doctors Forum ===
National Doctors Forum (Bengali: ন্যাশনাল ডক্টরস ফোরাম, lit. 'National Doctors Forum') (NDF) (Note: Multiple references:) is the doctors wing of Bangladesh Jamaat-e-Islami. It is a member of the Federation of Islamic Medical Associations (FIMA). On 19 May 1989, the National Doctors Forum (NDF) was established by Yusuf Ali and 35 other doctors and medical professionals. In 1997, a central committee was formed. In 1999, another full central committee was formed.

=== Other organisations ===
- Bangladesh Jamaat-e-Islami Women's Wing
- Bangladesh Adarsha Shikkakh Federation (teachers wing)
- Bangladesh Sramik Kallyan Federation (trade union)
- Bangladesh Lawyers Council (lawyers wing)
- Samannito Sangskritik Sangsad (cultural wing)

== Election results ==
=== Jatiya Sangsad elections ===
Election year	Party leader	Votes	% of Percentage	Seats	+/–	Position	Outcome
1986	Ghulam Azam	1,314,057	4.6	10 / 300	▲10	▲3rd	Opposition
1988	Ghulam Azam	Boycotted		0 / 300	▼10	—N/a	Extra-parliamentary
1991	Ghulam Azam	4,117,737	12.2	18 / 300	▲18	▲3rd	Confidence and supply
February 1996	Ghulam Azam	Boycotted		0 / 300	▼18	—N/a	Extra-parliamentary
June 1996	Ghulam Azam	3,653,013	8.6	3 / 300	▲3	▼4th	Opposition
2001	Motiur Rahman Nizami	2,385,361	4.3	17 / 300	▲14	4th	Coalition government
2008	Motiur Rahman Nizami	3,186,384	4.6	2 / 300	▼15	4th	Opposition
2014	Motiur Rahman Nizami	Did not contest		0 / 300	▼2	—N/a	Extra-parliamentary
2018	Maqbul Ahmed	Did not contest		0 / 300	0	—N/a	Extra-parliamentary
2024	Shafiqur Rahman	Did not contest		0 / 300	0	—N/a	Extra-parliamentary
2026	Shafiqur Rahman	23,825,259	31.8	68 / 300	▲68	▲2nd	Opposition

== See also ==
- List of Islamic political parties
- Politics of Bangladesh
- List of political parties in Bangladesh

== Notes ==
Footnotes

== Sources ==
- Baxter, C (1997). Bangladesh, from a Nation to a State. Westview Press. ISBN 0-8133-3632-5. OCLC 47885632.
