= List of emirs of Bangladesh Jamaat-e-Islami =

Chief executives of the BJI

Emir of Bangladesh Jamaat-e-Islami

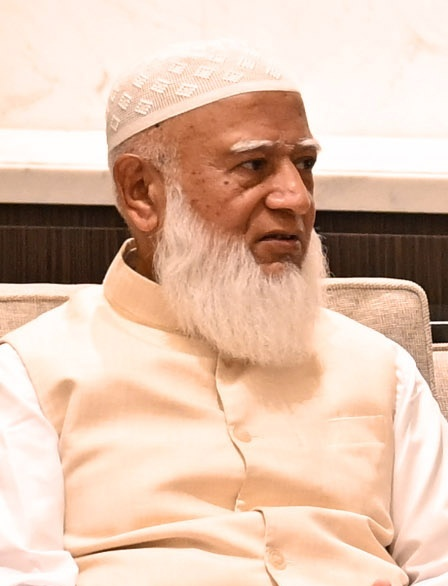
- Incumbent; Shafiqur Rahman since 19 November 2019
- Appointer: Committee consisting of members of the Central Executive Council, Central Majlis-e-Shura and Central Working Council of Bangladesh Jamaat-e-Islami
- Term length: No term limit
- Precursor: Maqbul Ahmad
- Formation: 27 May 1979; 47 years ago
- Website: Official website

The Emir of Bangladesh Jamaat-e-Islami (Bengali: আমীরে জামায়াত) is the chief executive of Bangladesh Jamaat-e-Islami (BJI), one of the principal political parties in Bangladesh, which emerged from the East Pakistani wing of the Jamaat-e-Islami Pakistan (JIP) in 1979. The position is de facto preserved for male only. The emir is assisted by a group of deputies known as deputy emirs. As of February 2026, the four deputy emirs are A. T. M. Azharul Islam, Mojibur Rahman, Syed Abdullah Mohammad Taher, and A. N. M. Shamsul Islam.

The party has a three-level decision-making body – Central Executive Council, Central Majlis-e-Shura and Central Working Council. Executive Council is the highest organ of the party, which is responsible for reviewing and executing the policies made by the Majlis-e-Shura and the Working Council. As of 2026, there is no women in the Central Executive Council.

The party's precursor branch, the Jamaat-e-Islami East Pakistan, was led by Maulana Muhammad Abdur Rahim from 1956 to 1960 and then by Ghulam Azam from 1960 until 1971 during the Bangladesh Liberation War, after which the Jamaat was banned from national politics in Bangladesh. Local members of the Jamaat merged with several other parties to form the Islamic Democratic League (IDL) in ahead of the 1979 general election. In 1979, the IDL was dissolved and the members of the erstwhile East Pakistan JIP reconvened to form the modern-day Bangladesh Jamaat-e-Islami (BJI).

The Jamaat's first acting emir was Abbas Ali Khan from 1979 to 1992 when Ghulam Azam was elected as its first emir. Motiur Rahman Nizami was the longest-serving emir of Bangladesh Jamaat-e-Islami, who served in the position for around 16 years from 2000 to 2016 when he was executed.

== East Pakistan (1956–1971) ==
List of emirs during 1956–1971
| No. | Portrait | Leader | Term began | Term end | Home district | Reference(s) |
|---|---|---|---|---|---|---|
| 1 | | Muhammad Abdur Rahim | 1956 | 1960 | Pirojpur | |
| 2 | | Ghulam Azam | 1960 | 1971 | Dhaka | |

== List of party emirs in the pro-independence era (1971–present) ==
List of emirs during 1971–present
| No. | Term begin | Term end | Name | Portrait | Home district | Reference(s) |
|---|---|---|---|---|---|---|
| Acting | 1979 | 1992 | Abbas Ali Khan | | Rajshahi | |
| 1 | 1992 | 2002 | Ghulam Azam | | Dhaka | |
| 2 | 2000 | 2016 | Motiur Rahman Nizami | | Pabna | |
| 3 | 2016 | 2019 | Maqbul Ahmed | | Mymensingh | |
| 4 | 2019 | present | Shafiqur Rahman | | Moulvibazar | |
