= Ameena Begum (politician) =

Bangladeshi politician

Ameena Shafiq
- আমেনা শফিক

Member of Parliament
- In office 1 October 2001 – 29 October 2006
- Preceded by: seat established
- Succeeded by: Shirin Sharmin Chaudhury
- Constituency: Reserved Seat-31

Personal details
- Party: Bangladesh Jamaat-e-Islami
- Spouse: Shafiqur Rahman (m. 1985)
- Children: 3
- Occupation: Politician, physician

Ameena Begum, (popularly known as Dr. Ameena Shafiq) is a Bangladeshi politician and former member of parliament. She served as a member of the Jatiya Sangsad from 2001 to 2006, representing women's reserved seat-31 (national 331) for Bangladesh Jamaat-e-Islami.

== Personal life ==
Ameena Begum has been married with Shafiqur Rahman since 5 January 1985, she and her husband are both politicians of Jamaat-e-Islami. The married couple has 3 children including 2 daughters and 1 son.
