= Maqbul Ahmad =

Bangladeshi politician

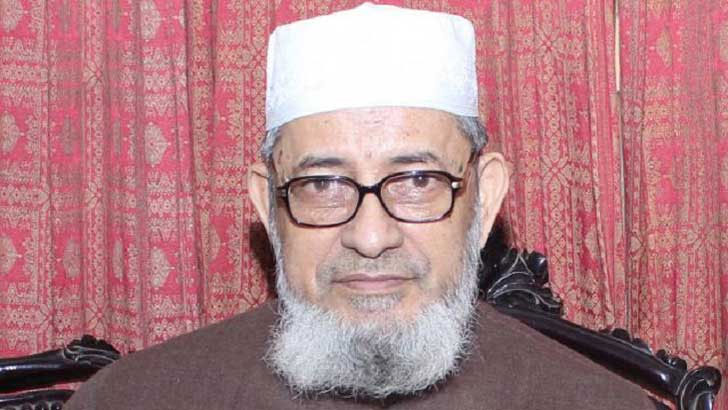

3rd Emir of Bangladesh Jamaat-e-Islami
- In office 17 October 2016 – 12 November 2019 (Acting: 12 May 2016 – 17 October 2016)
- Preceded by: Motiur Rahman Nizami
- Succeeded by: Shafiqur Rahman

Personal details
- Born: 2 August 1939 Daganbhuiyan, Bengal Presidency, British India
- Died: 13 April 2021 (aged 81) Ibn Sina Medical College, Dhaka
- Party: Bangladesh Jamaat-e-Islami
- Spouse: Shuriya Begum
- Profession: Politician, scholar

Maqbul Ahmad (2 August 1939 – 13 April 2021) was a Bangladeshi politician and cleric who served as the 3rd emir of the Bangladesh Jamaat-e-Islami from 2016 to 2019. He was appointed as emir in October 2016 after serving as acting emir for six months.

== History ==
Maqbul Ahmad was born in 1939 in Feni.

== Emir of Jamaat ==
He became acting emir of the Jamaat after Motiur Rahman Nizami was executed in May 2016.

== Death ==
Ahmed died on 13 April 2021, from COVID-19 at Ibn Sina Medical College Hospital, Dhaka, Bangladesh.

Political offices
Preceded by Motiur Rahman Nizami	Emir of Bangladesh Jamaat-e-Islami; 2016–2019	Succeeded by Shafiqur Rahman
