= Shafiqur Rahman =

Bangladeshi politician (born 1958)

- শফিকুর রহমান
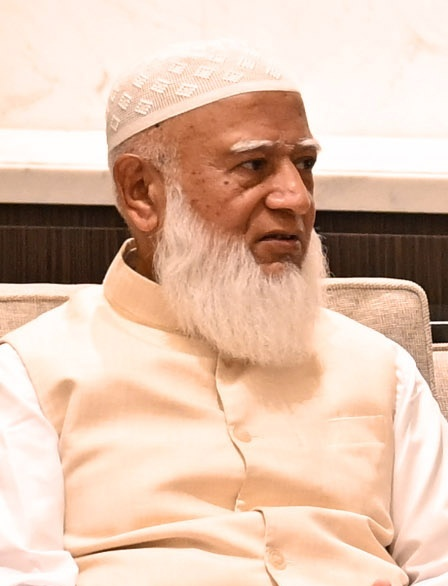
- Rahman in 2025

8th Leader of the Opposition
- Incumbent
- Assumed office 17 February 2026
- President: Mohammed Shahabuddin; Hafiz Uddin Ahmad (acting); Mirza Fakhrul Islam Alamgir
- Prime Minister: Tarique Rahman
- Deputy: Syed Abdullah Muhammad Taher
- Preceded by: GM Quader

Member of Parliament
- Incumbent
- Assumed office 17 February 2026
- Preceded by: Kamal Ahmed Majumder
- Constituency: Dhaka-15

4th Emir of Bangladesh Jamaat-e-Islami
- Incumbent
- Assumed office 12 November 2019
- Secretary-General: Miya Ghulam Parwar
- Preceded by: Maqbul Ahmad

6th Secretary-General of the Bangladesh Jamaat-e-Islami
- In office 2011–2019
- Emir: Motiur Rahman Nizami; Maqbul Ahmed
- Preceded by: ATM Azharul Islam
- Succeeded by: Mia Golam Parwar

Personal details
- Born: 31 October 1958 (age 68) Kulaura, Sylhet, East Pakistan, (now Bangladesh)
- Party: Bangladesh Jamaat-e-Islami
- Spouse: Ameena Begum (m. 1985)
- Children: 3
- Parent(s): Abru Mia (father); Khatibun (mother)
- Education: Baramachal High School; Murari Chand College; Sylhet MAG Osmani Medical College
- Occupation: Politician • physician • businessman
- Organization: BICS (1977–1984); BSL (JSD) (1973–1975)
- Website: Dr. Shafiqur Rahman

Shafiqur Rahman (Note: Bengali: শফিকুর রহমান, romanized: Śôphikur Rôhômān) (born 31 October 1958) is a Bangladeshi politician and physician who has been serving as the Leader of the Opposition since February 2026 and as the emir (party leader) of the Bangladesh Jamaat-e-Islami since 2019.

Born in Kulaura, Rahman joined politics in student life by affiliating with the JaSaD Chhatra League in 1973, followed by the Bangladesh Islami Chhatra Shibir in 1977. After graduation, he joined the Sylhet District unit of Jamaat-e-Islami party in 1984. Following ATM Azharul Islam's detention in 2011, he became the acting secretary-general of the party. In 2019, he was elected as the emir of the party.

== Early life ==
Rahman was born on 31 October 1958 in Bhatera, Kulaura Upazila, Sylhet District, East Pakistan, Pakistan (present-day Kulaura Upazila, Moulvibazar District, Bangladesh). His father's name is Abru Mia and mother's name is Khatibun. He is the third son of his family. Rahman passed SSC from Baramachal High School in 1974, then he passed HSC from Murari Chand College in Sylhet in 1976. He got MBBS degree from Sylhet MAG Osmani Medical College in 1983.

== Political career ==
Shafiqur Rahman started his political career by joining JaSaD Chhatra League, the student wing of Jatiya Samajtantrik Dal (JaSaD) in 1973. He is one of the several leaders of the Jamaat-e-Islami who were affiliated with the organization when the party was banned. Though he claimed that his affiliation with the organization was the part of a "wave" when a large number of youth joined the leftist organizations opposing the policies of ruling Awami League, critics claim that this was a part of the "hideout" policy of many Jamaat-e-Islami supporters to prevent persecution. The BBC Bangla admitted the difficulties of verifying the claim as the period was turbulent for JaSaD Chhatra League also and no record was kept by the organization then for security reasons. However, leader of his college committee of JaSaD Chhatra League argued that Rahman was simply a supporter of the organization, not any worker or leader.

He left the JaSaD Chhatra League in 1975. He expressed his dismay with the organization for their claimed criminal activities. He also claimed that during the time, he found a secret Islamist group in his student hall and got affiliated with them. As he stated:

While I was in MC College, I saw that they (JaSaD Chhatra League) had started robbing banks again. They had started robbing police stations and weapons and had started various kinds of misdeeds. Then I got disgusted with them too. I went off for a few days, but I knew something about them. My life was in danger because of this information. [...] Finally, Alhamdulillah, by the grace of Allah, I realized that the people in the room where I was staying were members of an Islamic organization. But they kept it a secret. They were very secretive. Later, I came to know that they were with an Islamic student organization. I asked them and accepted their invitation.

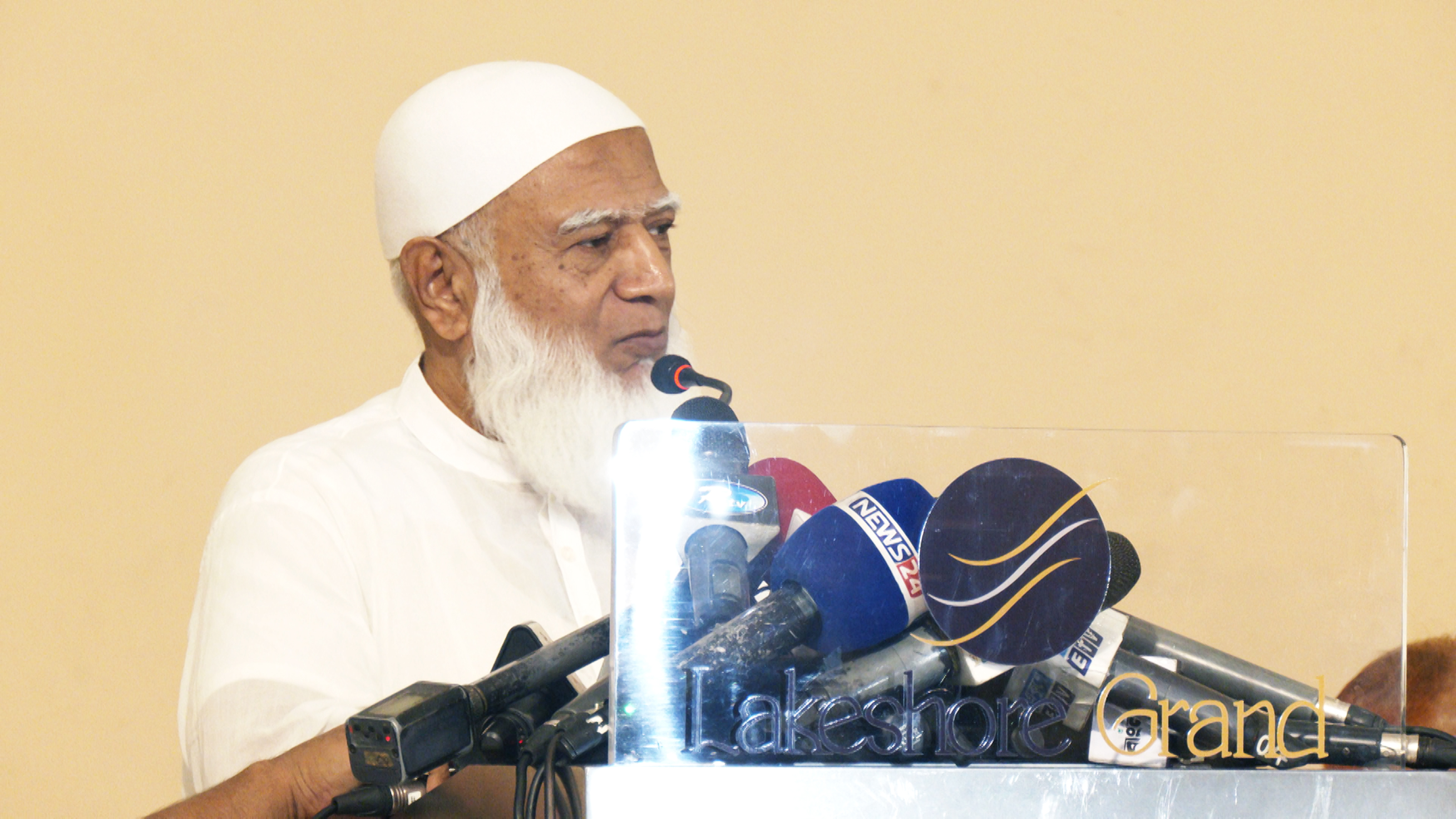
Shafiqur Rahman in press conference, 2024

He joined Islami Chhatra Shibir, the de facto male student wing of Jamaat-e-Islami in 1977. While he was studying in medical college, he became president of the local Chhatra Shibir medical branch and later the Sylhet District branch of Chhatra Shibir. In 1984, He joined Jamaat-e-Islami. Later, he served as the emir of Sylhet unit of the party.

In 2010, he became the assistant secretary-general at the central committee of the party. After ATM Azharul Islam, the acting secretary-general, was arrested for the war crimes trial in 2011, he was declared the acting secretary-general on 19 September 2011. In 2016, he took over as secretary-general, which he held until 2019.

=== Emir of Bangladesh Jamaat-e-Islami (2019–present) ===
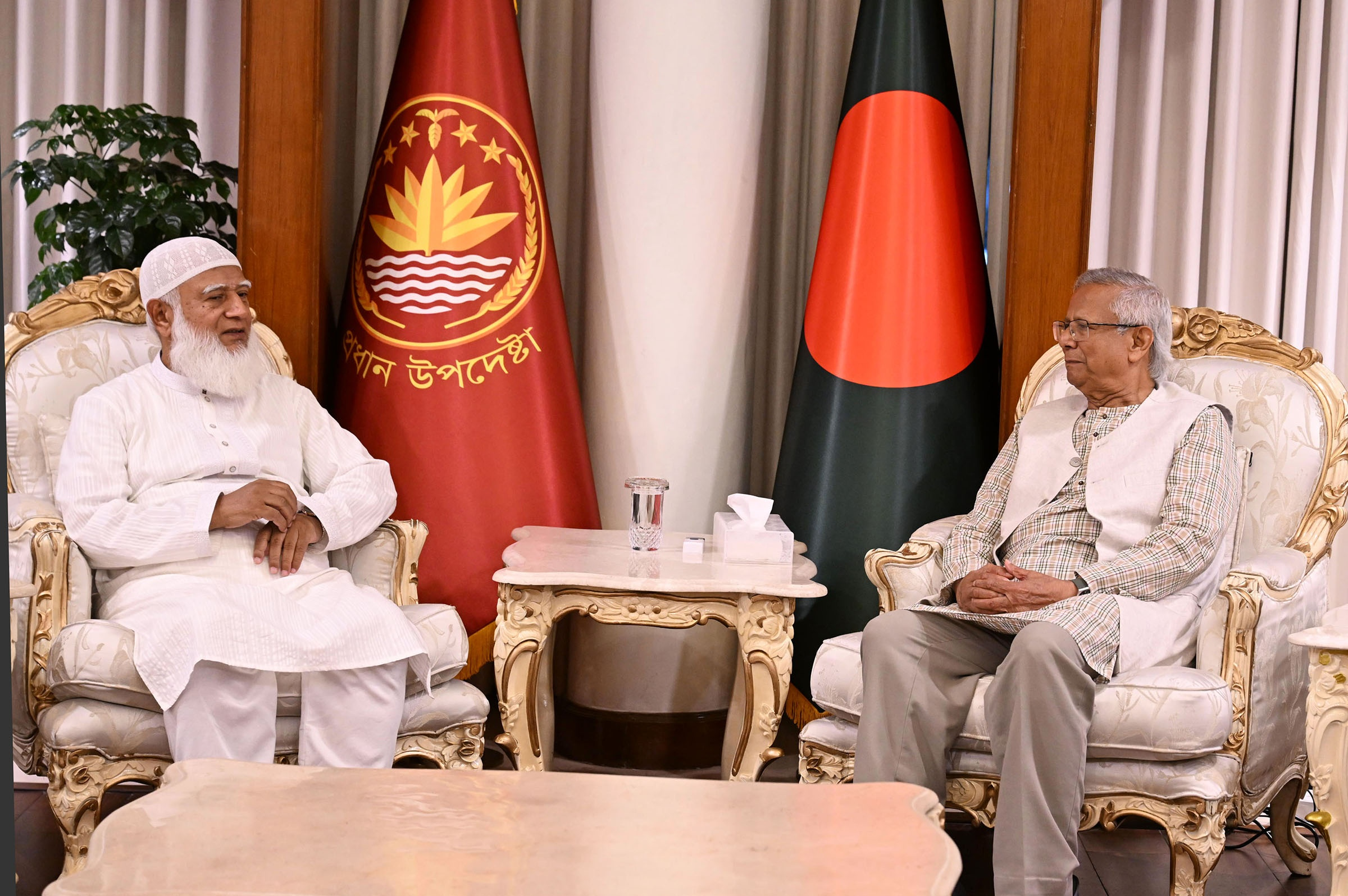
Rahman meeting with the chief adviser Muhammad Yunus, 24 May 2025

Shafiqur Rahman was elected as the emir of Bangladesh Jamaat-e-Islami in 2018, succeeding Maqbul Ahmed. He was elected by the direct votes of rukon (full members) of the party. He was reelected on 2023 and 2025. He led the party during a period of persecution by the ruling Awami League government. As the leader of the party, he has been credited for moving it away from its traditional "mantle" and opening the party to and attracting variety of politicians, religious minorities and the freedom fighters. Bangladeshi political analyst Altaf Parvez credited Rahman for the ideological reformation and political transformation of the party. He also noted how Rahman worked to expand female participation and international engagement of the party.

== Political positions ==
According to the political analyst Saleh Uddin Ahmad, Rahman is comparatively "moderate" and "changeable" than previous emirs of the Jamaat-e-Islami. Ahmed attributed this to Rahman's educational background and his former affiliation with the JaSaD, a left-wing party.

Rahman considers his party to be a "progressive and moderate Islamic party". He has supported the rights of religious minorities of the country. He took initiative to protect the lives and the properties of minorities, visited Hindu temples, and called to nominate Hindu candidates from his party. He has also supported and promised maintaining women's right to work outside and freedom of clothing if the party forms government.

However, Rahman has expressed opposition to female leadership in his party. In an interview with Al Jazeera, he claimed that women's "physical difference" from the men restricts them to maternal duties. Moreover, he has frequently spoken about women's challenge of balancing professional duties and motherhood. He has even said that if his party forms government, those women who choose to stay at home instead of working outside will be rewarded by the government. He has indirectly encouraged women to withdraw from the workforce. Additionally, he has advocated reducing female working hours from eight to five hours after the maternity leave with the "consent of mothers", with the rest of the working hours to be paid by the government; a move for which he has been criticized multiple times.

== Public image ==
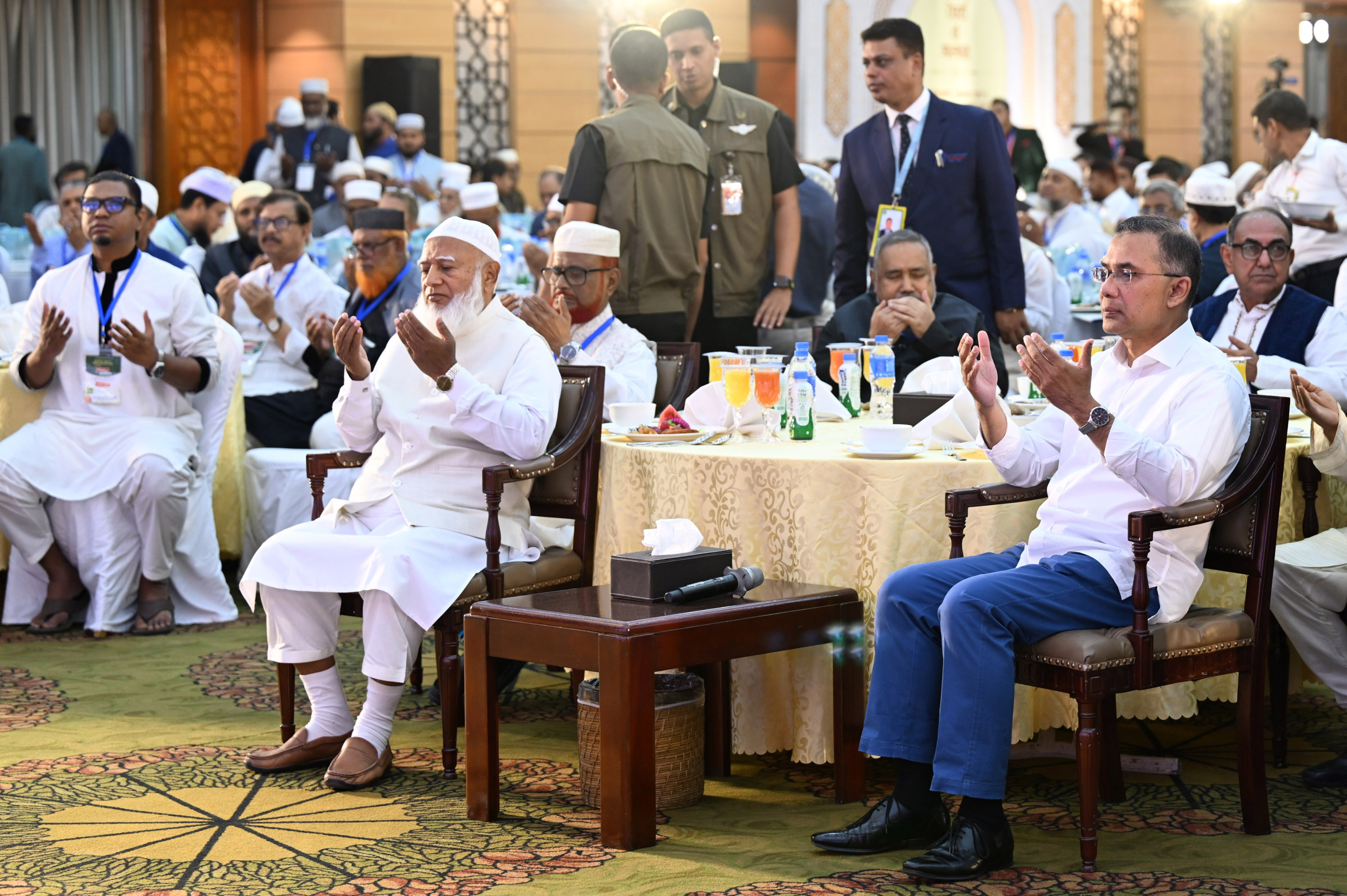
Rahman with the incumbent Bangladeshi prime minister Tarique Rahman at an iftar ceremony, 28 February 2026

During the Jamaat-e-Islami's campaign for the 2026 general election, fan-made election campaign banners in different parts of Bangladesh depicting Rahman in a design inspired by the television series Game of Thrones, accompanied by the phrase "Winter Is Coming", drew public attention.

According to an Al Jazeera report, Rahman is often addressed as "Dadu" (Grandfather) by his young supporters during the campaign. The report adds that his white beard, soft-spoken nature, and attentiveness to supporters align with this image.

== Personal life ==
Rahman was married on 5 January 1985 to Ameena Begum. She served as MP for a reserved seat in the 2001 Bangladeshi general election in support of Jamaat-e-Islami. The couple have two daughters and one son. He claimed that one of his cousins was a martyred freedom fighter in the Liberation War.

=== Health ===
On 19 July 2025, Shafiqur Rahman got sick and collapsed while he was giving a speech against corruption during the national rally of Bangladesh Jamaat-e-Islami in Suhrawardy Udyan, Dhaka. After completing the speech, he was sent to the Ibna Sina Medical College . Later on he was admitted to United Hospital Limited under cardiologist Dr Jahangir Kabir. An angiogram revealed three major blockages, leading to an urgent open-heart bypass surgery, where four bypasses were performed.

== Controversies ==
=== Alleged X account hack ===
On 31 January 2026 at 16.37 BST, a post was made from Rahman's X account that made derogatory remarks on women working out of home, including comparing their work with "prostitution". Later Rahman's Facebook post at night and his party's news conference the later day claimed that his X account was hacked from an email sent from the Bangabhaban and it was recovered by the party's cyber team within 55 minutes of the post being made. A general diary (GD) was also filed by Rahman at Hatirjheel police station. The post created heavy controversy, the opposition challenged the narrative, particularly the claimed account recovery within 55 minutes, and protests occurred in multiple places in the country. The assistant programmer of Bangabhaban Mohammad Sarwar Alam was detained under the Cyber Security Ordinance, 2025. An investigation by the Dissent, a digital investigative media outlet based in Dhaka, found evidence of attempted hacking of devices and accounts used to manage social media accounts of Jamaat's central leaders.

== Philanthropy ==
Rahman runs a number of charity and nonprofit organizations and institutions in his native region Sylhet. He is also one of the founders of Sylhet Women's Medical College. Many non-Muslims also work in his organisations and institutions.

== Electoral history ==
Year	Constituency	Party	Votes	%	Result
2001	Moulvibazar-2	Jamaat	12,415	7.20	Lost
2018	Dhaka-15	Jamaat	39,071	11.47	Lost
2026	Dhaka-15	Jamaat	85,131	54.20	Won

== See also ==
- Mia Golam Parwar

== Notes ==
Political offices
Preceded by Maqbul Ahmad	Emir of Bangladesh Jamaat-e-Islami; 2019–Present	Succeeded by TBD
