= Maidul Islam (scholar) =

Indian political scientist

- Born: 5 February 1980 (age 46); Calcutta, West Bengal, India
- Occupation: Professor of Political Science

Academic background
- Education: University of Oxford, Jawaharlal Nehru University, Presidency College, Kolkata
- Doctoral advisor: Nandini Gooptu

Academic work
- Discipline: Political Science
- Sub-discipline: South Asian Politics, Political Islam, Muslim Identity in India and Bangladesh
- Institutions: Centre for Studies in Social Sciences, Calcutta

Maidul Islam (born 5 February 1980) is an Indian political scientist whose research focuses on political theory, South Asian politics, political Islam, and Muslim identity in India and Bangladesh. He is a professor of political science at the Centre for Studies in Social Sciences, Calcutta (CSSSC).

== Early life and education ==
Islam was born in Calcutta, West Bengal. He completed his secondary education at South Point High School and his higher secondary education at Andrews High School in Salimpur. He earned a bachelor's degree in political science from Presidency College, Kolkata, and subsequently completed a master's degree and an MPhil in political science at the Centre for Political Studies, Jawaharlal Nehru University (JNU), New Delhi.

He pursued doctoral studies in politics at Brasenose College, University of Oxford, where he received a DPhil. His doctoral research examined the ideological and political trajectories of Jamaat-e-Islami in contemporary India and Bangladesh under the supervision of Nandini Gooptu. He received a Clarendon Scholarship during his doctoral studies.

== Career ==
Islam began his academic career in political science before joining the Tata Institute of Social Sciences as an assistant professor in 2012. He subsequently taught at Presidency University, Kolkata, and joined the Centre for Studies in Social Sciences, Calcutta, in 2016. He became a professor of political science at the centre in October 2024. He was also a fellow at the Indian Institute of Advanced Study in Shimla in 2013.

== Research and publications ==
Islam's research examines political theory, South Asian politics, political Islam, Muslim political identity, and the relationship between political economy and social marginalisation.

His first major monograph, Limits of Islamism: Jamaat-e-Islami in Contemporary India and Bangladesh, was published by Cambridge University Press in 2015. Based on his doctoral research, the book examines the ideological and political trajectories of Jamaat-e-Islami in India and Bangladesh.

His subsequent book, Indian Muslim(s) after Liberalization, was published by Oxford University Press in 2019. It examines the socioeconomic conditions and political expressions of Indian Muslims in the context of economic liberalisation, social exclusion, and identity politics.

In 2022, Routledge published his book Political Theory and South Asian Counter-Narratives, which examines political theory and counter-narratives emerging from South Asia in relation to ideas of progress and secularism.

Islam has also published academic articles, as well as widely spoken to the media and the general public, on Indian politics, secularism, political Islam, cinema, and religious nationalism. His article "Authoritarianism and Majoritarian Religious Nationalism in Contemporary India" appeared in World Affairs in 2024.

== Selected bibliography ==
- Limits of Islamism: Jamaat-e-Islami in Contemporary India and Bangladesh. Cambridge University Press, 2015.
- Indian Muslim(s) after Liberalization. Oxford University Press, 2019.
- Political Theory and South Asian Counter-Narratives. Routledge, 2022.

== See also ==
- Partha Chatterjee
- Prachi Deshpande
