= Bangladesh Lawyers Council =

Lawyers organisation in Bangladesh

- বাংলাদেশ ল’ইয়ার্স কাউন্সিল
- Official logo of the Bangladesh Lawyers Council
- Type: Lawyers organization
- Location: Bangladesh
- Secretary General: Mohammed Motiur Rahman Akand
- Chief Advisor: Shafiqur Rahman
- President: Md. Jasim Uddin Sarkar
- Parent organization: Bangladesh Jamaat-e-Islami

Bangladesh Lawyers Council (Bengali: বাংলাদেশ ল’ইয়ার্স কাউন্সিল, lit. 'Bangladesh Lawyers Council') (Note: Multiple references:) is an Islamic lawyers organisation in Bangladesh and the lawyers wing of Bangladesh Jamaat-e-Islami.

== History ==
Bangladesh Lawyers Council and the BNP-backed Bangladesh Jatiotabadi Ainjibi Forum together launched several programmes and boycotts and supported each other against the Awami League regime during their rule, the Bangladesh Lawyers Council participates in the Bangladesh Supreme Court Bar elections.

In October 2022, Bangladesh Lawyers Council held a discussion and exchange meeting in Sylhet, Bangladesh.

In February 2023, Bangladesh Lawyers Council held a rally in Dhaka, Bangladesh.

In October 2023, Bangladesh Lawyers Council condemned the arrest of Bangladesh Lawyers Council Secretary General, Motiur Rahman Akanda, and held a protest rally in Nilphamari, Rangpur.

In December 2023, it was announced that Bangladesh Lawyers Council in support of the BNP-backed Bangladesh Jatiotabadi Ainjibi Forum will boycott all courts of Bangladesh from 1 January 2024 until 7 January 2024.

In February 2024, Bangladesh Lawyers Council held a rally in Dhaka.

In September 2024, a discussion and exchange meeting was held by the Bogura branch of Bangladesh Lawyers Council.

In October 2024, the Bhola District Bar Branch of the Bangladesh Lawyers Council held a conference.

In February 2025, clashes occurred between the BNP-backed Jatiotabadi Ainjibi Forum and Bangladesh Lawyers Council and an armed attack on members of Jamaat-backed Bangladesh Lawyers Council occurred, the attack resulted in 3 people being injured including 2 members of the Lawyers Council due to a dispute related to the Patuakhali District Bar Association elections.

On 24 March 2025, the Sirajganj District branch of Bangladesh Lawyers Council held an Iftar and dua party.

In April 2025, Bangladesh Lawyers Council joined pro-Palestine solidarity protests and held demonstrations in several districts.

== Leadership ==
The president of Bangladesh Lawyers Council is Md. Jasim Uddin Sarkar. The general secretary of Bangladesh Lawyers Council is Motiur Rahman Akanda.

== See also ==
- Bangladesh Jatiotabadi Ainjibi Forum
