= Masjid Mission Academy =

- মসজিদ মিশন একাডেমী

Location
- Barakuthi Road, Ghoramara, Boalia; Rajshahi, 6100; Bangladesh
- Coordinates: 24.3639°N 88.5999°E

Information
- Established: 1981, college section in 2009
- School board: Rajshahi Education Board
- Principal: Md. Shahadat Hossain
- Grades: 1-12
- Gender: Male (Barakuthi Campus) and female (Seroil Campus)
- Age range: 6-18
- Enrollment: 6000+
- Language: Bangla
- Hours in school day: 10 hours
- Campus type: urban
- Sports: Football, cricket
- Communities served: মসজিদ মিশন একাডেমী, রাজশাহী- Masjid Mission Academy, Rajshahi, Facebook
- Website: mmaraj.org

Masjid Mission Academy, Rajshahi (MMA) (Bengali: মসজিদ মিশন একাডেমী), is a school and college in Ghoramara, Boalia Thana, Rajshahi, Bangladesh. It offers education for students ranging from first grade to twelfth grade (approximately ages 7 to 18). With over 6,000 students, MMA is one of the largest private schools in Rajshahi. It is located near the Padma River.

The school was founded in 1981. It has a legacy of quality and contemporary education based on Islamic knowledge. The founding principal is Md. Sirajul Islam. The school is one of the famous destinations for quality education in Rajshahi city. Rajshahi is also known as the education city of Bangladesh. The school is situated at the center of the city. It promotes quality education from nursery to twelve class. It is operated by Rajshahi Masjid Mission. Female campus of the school established in 2004 at Seroil. First batch of school participated in Secondary School Certificate (SSC) in 1991 and Higher Secondary Certificate (HSC) in 1997.

== Controversies ==
There aren't allegations that the organization has recruited the accused in the case filed under the anti-sabotage and anti-terrorism law against the mosque mission academy, which is using funds from different countries including the Middle East and abroad. In 2016, the Ministry of Home Affairs of Bangladesh issued a letter to the Ministry of Education based on the intelligence report. It was said that Mosque mission academy was used for secret political activities of Jamaat-e-Islami Bangladesh, which lost its registration. Books prescribed by Jamaat-e-Islami outside the books prescribed by the state are taught in this institution.

After the controversy arose, the Bangladesh Audit Department completed an audit of the institution and found serious financial inconsistencies. According to their report, the institution collects compulsory money from students in the name of the foundation. No account is kept of the expenditure of this money, which is against the law. Besides, the report also provided information about embezzlement of around Tk 11 crore in 10 years.

A member of the Parliamentary Standing Committee on the Ministry of Education told a news conference that the embezzled money had been spent on anti-state activities. At the same time, he complained that no recruitment was done in this institution outside of Islam. There is not even student admission, which is in conflict with the constitution of the country. He revoked the registration of the Masjid Mission Foundation and demanded that the three branches of the Masjid Mission Academy School and College be run in the same way as other educational institutions under the MPO of the state.

Against this information, however, a statement under the banner of Alumni of Masjid Mission Academy School and College was published in the Daily Sangram, known as the mouthpiece of Jamaat-e-Islami Bangladesh.

Earlier, in 2005, there was a controversy over the teaching methods and curriculum of this institution after finding Mamun, a member of Jamaat-ul-Mujahideen Bangladesh (JMB), a banned organization accused of militancy, and was one of the accused in a series of bombings across the country on August 17 of that year, was a student of this institution.
