= Abbas Ali Khan =

Pakistani politician, member of the 3rd National Assembly of Pakistan

- আব্বাস আলী খান

Emir of Bangladesh Jamaat-e-Islami (acting)
- In office 1979–1992
- Preceded by: established
- Succeeded by: Ghulam Azam

Education Minister of East Pakistan
- In office 17 September 1971 – 14 December 1971
- Governor: Abdul Motaleb Malik
- Administrator: A. A. K. Niazi
- Preceded by: S. M. Amzad Hossain
- Succeeded by: dissolved

Member of the Pakistan Parliament for NE-8 Dinajpur-Bogra
- In office 1962–1965
- President: Ayub Khan
- Succeeded by: Muhammad Yusuf Ali

Personal details
- Born: 1914 Bogra District, Bengal Presidency, British India
- Died: 3 October 1999 (aged 84–85) Dhaka, Bangladesh
- Party: Bangladesh Jamaat-e-Islami
- Other political affiliations: Jamaat-e-Islami Pakistan (1955–1971)
- Education: Hooghly Madrasah; Carmichael College (B.A.)
- Occupation: civil servant, educator, politician

Abbas Ali Khan (Note: Bengali: আব্বাস আলী খান) (1914 – 3 October 1999) was an educator and politician who served as the Emir of Bangladesh Jamaat-e-Islami from 1979 to 1992. He also served as Education minister of East Pakistan (now Bangladesh). He was elected as a Member of Parliament of the 3rd National Assembly of Pakistan. He briefly served as the personal secretary of Fazlul Haque, the Prime Minister of Bengal.

== Biography ==
Abbas Ali Khan was born in 1914 in Joypurhat Thana, Bogra District, Bengal Presidency, British India. In 1925, he passed high matriculation examination from Hooghly Madrasah. Ten years after examination, he acquired B.A degree from Carmichael College. Then he became a civil servant and worked for Indian government from 1936 to 1947. He also became secretary of A.K. Fazlul Huq, first prime minister of Bengal. In 1955, eight years after the independence of Pakistan, he became a member of Jamaat-e-Islami Pakistan and later he became ameer of its branch of Rajshahi Division. In 1962, Khan became member of the 3rd National Assembly of Pakistan representing Dinajpur-Bogra. In 1971, he was made deputy ameer of the East Pakistan Jamaat-e-Islami, provincial branch of the Jamaat-e-Islami Pakistan. During the Bangladesh Liberation War, he was appointed as education minister in the Malik ministry, the last cabinet of East Pakistan. After the independence of Bangladesh, on 24 December 1971, he was arrested by the government for collaborating with Pakistan during the war. On 30 November 1973, the government announced a general amnesty for detained cabinet members, and he was released. In 1979, Jamaat-e-Islami Bangladesh was established and he became senior nayeeb-e-ameer of the party. He also became acting ameer at the time. In 1991, Ghulam Azam was elected as ameer and Khan's responsibility as acting ameer ended. But then government arrested him in 1992 and Khan became acting ameer again for 16 months. Khan died in Dhaka on 3 October 1999 of liver cirrhosis.

== Notes ==
Political offices
Preceded by Ghulam Azam	Emir of Bangladesh Jamaat-e-Islami (acting); 1979–1994	Succeeded by Ghulam Azam
