= Prachi Deshpande =

Indian historian studying South Asian historiography

- Born: 14 December 1972 (age 53)
- Title: Professor of History
- Awards: Infosys Prize (2020)

Academic background
- Education: Tufts University; Jawaharlal Nehru University; Fergusson University
- Thesis: Narratives of Pride: History and Regional Identity in Maharashtra, India, c. 1870-1960
- Doctoral advisor: Sugata Bose

Academic work
- Discipline: Early Modern South Asian History
- Sub-discipline: Social and cultural history of western India
- Institutions: Colorado State University; Rutgers University; UC Berkeley; Centre for Studies in Social Sciences, Calcutta
- Main interests: Script and Language, Cultures of Historiography, Marathi literature and culture, Scribal elites, Modernity
- Website: Official Website

Prachi Deshpande (born 14 December 1972) is an Indian historian and Professor of History at the Centre for Studies in Social Sciences, Calcutta. In 2020, Deshpande received the Infosys Prize for Humanities – History for her extraordinarily nuanced and highly sophisticated treatment of South Asian historiography. She was the only female awardee that year.

== Education ==
Deshpande was born in Pune, Maharashtra in 1972. She completed her undergraduate studies in History at Fergusson College, Pune (1988–1993), followed by an MA in History at Jawaharlal Nehru University, New Delhi (1993–1995). She later pursued her doctoral studies (1997–2002) under the supervision of historian Sugata Bose at Tufts University, Medford, MA. Her doctoral thesis is titled Narratives of Pride: History and Regional Identity in Maharashtra, India, c. 1870-1960.

== Career ==
After completing her doctorate at Tufts University, Massachusetts, in 2002, Deshpande taught as an assistant and associate professor at several institutions in the United States, including Colorado State University (2002–2004), Rutgers University (2004–2006), and the University of California, Berkeley (2006–2010). In 2010, she returned to India to join the Centre for Studies in Social Sciences, Calcutta, where she continues to work as a professor of history. She currently serves as consulting editor of the Journal of the History of Ideas.

== Publications ==
Deshpande has published works in both Marathi and English. Her first book, Creative Pasts: Historical Memory and Identity in Western India, 1700–1960 (Columbia University Press, 2007), based on her doctoral research, examines modern history-writing practices in Marathi-speaking regions of Western India and their role in shaping Maharashtrian regional identity. Her second and most recent book, Scripts of Power: Writing, Language Practices, and Cultural History in Western India (Orient BlackSwan, 2023), explores the cultural history of Modi, the cursive script used for Marathi in Western India, and highlights its striking resonances with contemporary concerns.

=== Select Journal Articles ===
- “The Marathi Kaulnāmā: Property, Sovereignty and Documentation in a Persianate Form.” Journal of the Economic and Social History of the Orient, 64(5–6), 583–614, 2021.
- “Shuddhalekhan: Orthography, Community and the Marathi Public Sphere.” Economic and Political Weekly, vol. 51, no. 6, 2016, pp. 72–82.
- "The writerly self: Literacy, discipline and codes of conduct in early modern western India." The Indian Economic and Social History Review, 53(4), 449–471, 2016.
- “The Making of an Indian Nationalist Archive: Lakshmibai, Jhansi, and 1857.” The Journal of Asian Studies, vol. 67, no. 3, 2008, pp. 855–79.
- "Caste as Maratha: Social categories, colonial policy and identity in early twentieth-century Maharashtra." The Indian Economic and Social History Review, 41(1), 7-32, 2004.
