= Ghulam Azam =

Bangladeshi politician and war criminal (1922–2014)

- গোলাম আযম
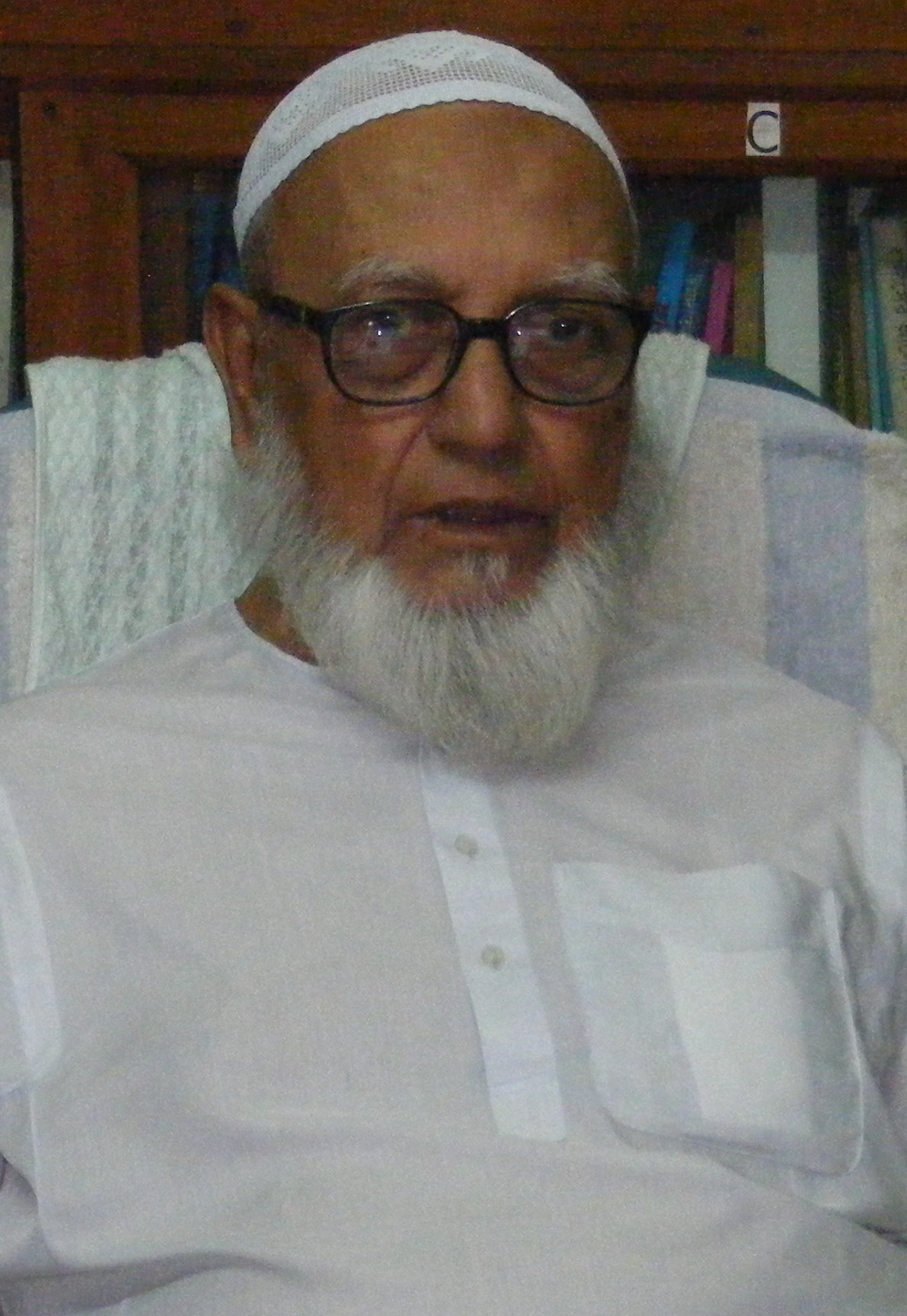
- Azam in 2009

1st Emir of Bangladesh Jamaat-e-Islami
- In office 1992–2000
- Preceded by: Abbas Ali Khan (acting)
- Succeeded by: Motiur Rahman Nizami

Emir of Jamaat-e-Islami East Pakistan
- In office 1960–1971
- Preceded by: Abdur Rahim
- Succeeded by: Abbas Ali Khan

DUCSU General secretary
- In office 1947–1952
- Preceded by: Sudhir Dutta
- Succeeded by: Julmat Ali Khan; Farid Ahmed

Personal details
- Born: 7 November 1922 Mia Shaheb Moidan, Bengal, British India (now Bangladesh)
- Died: 23 October 2014 (aged 91) Bangladesh Medical University, Dhaka, Bangladesh
- Resting place: Moghbazar, Dhaka, Bangladesh
- Party: Bangladesh Jamaat-e-Islami
- Spouse: Afifa Azam
- Children: 6, including Azmi
- Education: University of Dhaka
- Occupation: Politician, teacher

Ghulam Azam (Note: Bengali: গোলাম আযম) (7 November 1922 – 23 October 2014) was a Bangladeshi Islamist, convicted war criminal, and politician who served as the first emir of Bangladesh Jamaat-e-Islami (BJI) from 1992 to 2002.

Azam was involved in forming paramilitary groups, including Razakar Bahini and Al-Badr, to support the Pakistan Army during the Bangladesh Liberation War. These militias were involved in war crimes, including murder, rape, and torture during the Bangladesh genocide and opposed the Mukti Bahini, who fought for the independence of Bangladesh.

Azam was arrested on 11 January 2012 by the International Crimes Tribunal of Bangladesh (ICT). He was charged and found guilty of war crimes such as conspiring, planning, incitement to and complicity in committing the genocide and was sentenced to 90 years in prison on 15 July 2013. The tribunal stated that Azam deserved capital punishment for his activity during the war but was given a lenient punishment of imprisonment because of his old age and poor health. The trial was criticized by international observers such as Human Rights Watch and Amnesty International for being politically motivated. The deficiencies highlighted in the trial included judges improperly conducting "investigation on behalf of the prosecution", "collusion and bias among prosecutors and judges", failure "to protect defence witnesses" and "lack of evidence to establish guilt beyond a reasonable doubt".

== Family background and education ==
Ghulam Azam was born on 7 November 1922 in his maternal home, Shah Saheb Bari of Lakshmibazar, Dacca, Bengal Presidency. He was the eldest son of Ghulam Kabir and Sayeda Ashrafunnisa. His ancestral home is Maulvi Bari in Birgaon Village, Brahmanbaria. His paternal family descends from Sheikh Taqi, who was said to have been a foreign preacher who settled in Birgaon beside the Meghna River, though there is no record as to where he came from. His family residence was known locally as Maulvi Bari. Ghulam Azam's father, Ghulam Kabir, was a Mawlana and so was his father, Abdus Subhan. His great-grandfather, Sheikh Shahabuddin Munshi, was a religious scholar in the region east of the Meghna river. His mother Sayeda Ashrafunnisa was the daughter of Shah Sayed Abdul Munim, whose family is a Peer family. His father, Shah Sayed Emdad Ali was a descendant of Shah Sayed Sufi Hosseini who arrived from Iran via Delhi in 1722 AD and settled in what is now known as Sayedabad of Kaliakor. Ghulam Azam's education began at the local madrasa in Birgaon and then completed his secondary school education in Dhaka. After that, he enrolled at University of Dhaka where he completed BA and MA degrees in political science.

== Early political career ==
=== University ===
While studying at the University of Dhaka, Azam became active in student politics and was elected as the General Secretary of the Dhaka University Central Students' Union (DUCSU) for two consecutive years between 1947 and 1949. (Note: Although his published interview in Daily Azad on June 20, 1970 states "Bangla was a wrong decision about the establishment of Pakistan since Urdu was widely used and all Muslims of the Indian subcontinent were Urdu speakers.")

=== Bengali language movement ===
According to Jamaat-e-Islami sources, as the DUCSU General Secretary, Azam presented a memorandum to Liakat Ali Khan, the then Prime Minister of Pakistan, demanding Bengali as the state language on 27 November 1948. The sources also claim that, he was arrested for his involvement in the Language Movement, but his name has been removed intentionally from the list of language activists by the Dhaka University administration. Noted political analyst Badruddin Umar argued that Azam's assertions regarding his role in the Language Movement were politically motivated. Umar insisted that Azam highlighted these credentials specifically to secure Bangladeshi nationality upon his return from Pakistan after the Liberation War. According to Umar, this strategy was adopted because Azam realized that political Islam—his primary platform—could no longer be easily exploited in the secular framework of the newly independent Bangladesh.

On 20 June 1970, Azam was quoted in The Azad saying that fight for Bengali language was a mistake.

=== Jamaat-e-Islami ===
In 1950, Azam left Dhaka to teach political science at Government Carmichael College in Rangpur. During this time, he was influenced by the writings of Abul Ala Maududi, and he joined Maududi's party, Jamaat-e-Islami in 1954, and was later elected as the Secretary General of Jamaat-e-Islami's East Pakistan branch.

In 1964, the government of Ayub Khan banned Jamaat-e-Islami and its leaders, including Azam, and imprisoned them for eight months without trial. He was the general secretary of the Pakistan Democratic Movement, formed in 1967, and later he was elected as a member of the Democratic Action Committee in 1969 to transform the anti-Ayub movement into a popular uprising. In 1969, he became the Emir of Jamaat in East Pakistan. He and other opposition leaders took part in the Round Table Conference held in Rawalpindi in 1969 to solve the prevailing political impasse in Pakistan. On 13 March 1969, Khan announced his acceptance of their two fundamental demands of parliamentary government and direct elections.

In the run-up to the 1970 Pakistani general election, Azam, together with leaders of many other parties in East Pakistan (including the Pakistan Democratic Party, National Awami Party, Jamiat Ulema-e-Islam, and the Pakistan National League), protested against the Awami League for reportedly breaking up public meetings, physical attacks on political opponents, and the looting and destruction of party offices. During the 1970 election campaign, while Azam was the head of Jamaat-e-Islami East Pakistan, one account states that Jamaat-e-Islami chief Abul A'la Maududi was unable to address a planned public rally in Dhaka after party activists came under attack, attributing this to public resistance. Other commentary has instead described such incidents as part of a broader pattern of the Awami League forcibly disrupting the campaign meetings of rival parties, including Jamaat-e-Islami.

== Bangladesh Liberation War ==
=== Activities during 1971 War ===
During the Bangladesh Liberation War, Azam took a political stance in support of a unified Pakistan, and repeatedly denounced Awami League and Mukti Bahini secessionists, whose declared aim after 26 March 1971 became the establishment of an independent state of Bangladesh in place of East Pakistan. Excerpts from Azam's speeches after 25 March 1971 used to be published in the mouthpiece of Bangladesh Jamaat-e-Islami named The Daily Sangram. On 20 June 1971, Azam reaffirmed his support for the Pakistani army by citing that 'the army has eradicated nearly all criminals of East Pakistan'.

==== East Pakistan Central Peace Committee ====
During the war of 1971, Azam played a central role in the formation of East Pakistan Central Peace Committee on 11 April 1971. Azam was one of the founding members of this organization.

The Peace Committee served as a front for the army, informing on civil administration as well as the general public. They were also in charge of confiscating and redistributing shops and lands from Hindu and Bengali civilians, mainly relatives and friends of Mukti Bahini fighters. The Shanti Committee has also been alleged to have recruited Razakars. The first recruits included 96 Jamaat party members, who started training in an Ansar camp at Shahjahan Ali Road, Khulna.

During Azam's leadership of Jamaat-e-Islami, Ashraf Hossain, a leader of Jamaat's student wing, Islami Chhatra Sangha, created Al-Badr in Jamalpur on 22 April 1971. In April 1971, Azam and Motiur Rahman Nizami led demonstrations denouncing the independence movement as an Indian conspiracy. Azam denied the association between the Peace Committee and Razakar Bahini, even though they were formed by the government and headed by Pakistani army general Tikka Khan.

During the war, Azam travelled to West Pakistan at the time to consult Pakistani leaders. He claimed that his party (Jamaat) is trying its best to curb the activities of "miscreants". He took part in meetings with General Yahya Khan, the then military strongman of Pakistan and other military leaders to organize the campaign against Bangladeshi independence.

==== Foreign affairs ====
On 12 August 1971, Azam declared in a statement published in the Daily Sangram that "the supporters of the so-called Bangladesh Movement are the enemies of Islam, Pakistan, and Muslims". He also called for an all-out war against India. He called for the annexation of Assam.

According to ICT prosecution evidence, Azam presented a plan for the killing of intellectuals during a meeting with Rao Farman Ali in early September 1971. With his help, the Pakistan Army and the local collaborators executed the on 14 December 1971.

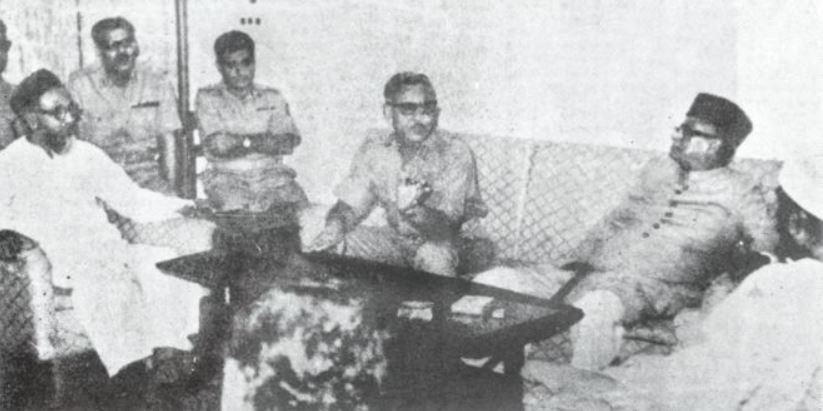
Ghulam Azam meets Governor Lt. Gen. Tikka Khan, one of the top architects of Operation Searchlight on 4 Apr. 1971 in Dhaka

On 20 June 1971, Azam claimed in Lahore that the Hindu minority in East Pakistan, under the leadership of Sheikh Mujibur Rahman, are conspiring to secede from Pakistan. On 12 August 1971, Azam again claimed in a statement published in the Daily Sangram that "the supporters of the Bangladesh Movement are the enemies of Islam, Pakistan, and Muslims". On his part, Azam denied all such accusations and challenged the validity of some and gave reasons to justify others. However, he admitted that he was on the list of collaborators of the Pakistani army, but denied that he was a war criminal. In 2011, Azam denied such sentiments and claimed that the Pakistani government censored The Daily Sangram.

==== 1971 election ====
The military junta of General Yahya Khan decided to call an election in an effort to legitimize itself. On 12 October 1971, Yahya Khan declared that an election would be held from 25 November to 9 December. Azam decided to take part in this election. According to a government declaration of 2 November, 53 candidates would be elected without competition. Jamaat received 14 of the uncontested seats.

In 2011, Azam claimed that the reasons for his opposition to the creation of Bangladesh were only political and he denied participation in any crime. He also disliked Indian involvement and influence in Bangladeshi internal society and economic matters.

== Leader of Jamaat-e-Islami Bangladesh ==
The government of newly independent Bangladesh banned Bangladesh Jamaat-e-Islami and cancelled Azam's citizenship, along with that of Nurul Amin, the former prime minister, due to their opposition to Bangladesh's independence. Following the independence of Bangladesh, he migrated to Pakistan.

In 1978, his citizenship was cancelled by the Bangladeshi government. However, Azam returned to Bangladesh on a Pakistani passport with a temporary visa, staying as a Pakistani national even after his visa expired. The Supreme Court of Bangladesh reinstated his citizenship in 1994. His stay was, however, unwelcome in Bangladesh and he was beaten up by a crowd near Baitul Mukarram while attending a funeral in 1981.

Azam was particularly critical of the military rule under Hussain Muhammad Ershad, who seized power in a bloodless coup in 1982. Azam proposed a caretaker government system to facilitate free and fair elections, which was adopted in 1990. In the 1991 Bangladeshi general election, Jamaat-e-Islami won 18 seats, and its support allowed the BNP to form a government.

During this time, he acted unofficially as the emir (leader) of the BJI until 1991, when he was officially elected to the post. This led the government to arrest him, and an unofficial court called "The People's Court" was established by civilians such as Jahanara Imam to try alleged war criminals and anti-independence activists. The Imam held a symbolic trial of Azam, where thousands of people gathered and gave the verdict that Azam's offences committed during the war deserve capital punishment. In 1994, he fought a lengthy legal battle, which resulted in the Supreme Court of Bangladesh ruling in his favour and restoring his nationality.

In the 1996 election, Jamaat won only three seats and most of their candidates lost their deposits. Azam announced his retirement from active politics in late 2000. He was succeeded by Motiur Rahman Nizami.

== War crimes trial ==
=== Arrest and incarceration ===
On 11 January 2012, Azam was arrested on charges of committing crimes against humanity and peace, genocide and war crimes in 1971 by the International Crimes Tribunal. His petition for bail was rejected by the ICT, and he was sent to Dhaka Central Jail. However, three hours later, he was taken to the Bangabandhu Sheikh Mujib Medical University (BSMMU) hospital for a medical check-up because of health issues.

According to The Daily Star, Azam was allowed to remain in a hospital prison cell despite being declared fit for trial by a medical team on 15 January. The same paper later acknowledged that he had been placed there because to his "ailing condition".

Azam's health was deteriorating rapidly after being imprisoned. His wife, Syeda Afifa Azam, reported in several newspapers as being shocked about Azam's treatment and stated that he was very weak and had lost 3 kilograms in a month due to malnutrition. She described his treatment as "a gross violation of human rights," even though he was kept in a hospital prison cell.

Azam's wife complained that he had been denied proper family visits and access to books, saying that this amounted to "mental torture". The Daily Star reported that Azam's wife and his counsels were allowed to meet him on 18 February.

On 25 February 2012, The Daily Star reported that Azam's nephew was denied a visit shortly before he entered the hospital prison, even though the application had initially been approved.

During the trial, former advisor to the Caretaker government of Bangladesh, human rights activist and witness for the prosecution, Sultanaa Kamal said:

In brutality, Ghulam Azam is synonymous with German ruler Hitler who had influential role in implementation and execution of genocide and ethnic cleansing.

In response to this statement, the defence counsel pointed out that the comparison was a fallacy and "fake with malicious intention" as Hitler held state power, which Azam did not and that in 1971, General Tikka Khan and Yahya Khan held state power. Prosecutor of ICT, Zead-Al-Malum said:

He was the one making all the decisions, why would he need to be on any committee? Being Hitler was enough for Hitler in World War II.

The International Union of Muslim Scholars, chaired by Yusuf al-Qaradawi, called the arrest "disgraceful," and called on the Bangladesh government to release him immediately, stating that "the charge of Professor Ghulam Azam and his fellow scholars and Islamic activists of committing war crimes more than forty years ago is irrational and cannot be accepted".

The judicial process under which Azam was on trial was criticized by international organizations such as Human Rights Watch and Amnesty International. Human Rights Watch criticized the "strong judicial bias towards the prosecution and grave violations of due process rights", calling the trial process deeply flawed and unable to meet international fair trial standards.

=== Verdict ===
Azam was convicted of war crimes during the Bangladesh Liberation War by the International Crimes Tribunal. The charges against Azam were torturing and the killings of a police officer Shiru Mia and three others. He was found guilty on all five charges and was sentenced to 90 years in prison.

The judges unanimously agreed that Azam deserved capital punishment but was given a lenient punishment because of his aging and poor health condition.

=== Responses ===
Azam had always maintained that he never participated in any crimes but tried "to help people as much as he could." In a press release, Jamaat's Acting Secretary General Rafiqul Islam rejected the International Crimes Tribunal's verdict against Azam by stating his conviction "nothing but a reflection of what AL-led 14-party alliance leaders had said against him Ghulam Azam, in different meetings". The Daily Amar Desh said that the evidence presented before the court against Ghulam Azam consisted of newspaper clippings published during 1971 and not independently proved.

== Death ==
Ghulam Azam died at age 91 on 23 October 2014 at Bangladesh Medical University, following a stroke after which he was put on life support. He died while serving jail sentences for crimes against humanity during the Bangladesh Liberation War. He was also suffering from kidney ailments.

Azam was buried at his family graveyard at Moghbazar, Dhaka on 25 October. His namaz-e-janaza (Islamic funeral prayer) was held at Bangladesh's national mosque Baitul Mokarram; thousands of people attended his funeral prayers,. Different quarters of the country protested against taking Azam's body to the national mosque.

== Family ==
His son, Abdullahil Amaan Azmi was a brigadier general in the Bangladesh Army who was dismissed without explanation. He was missing after 2016. In 2022, it was revealed by an investigative report by Netra News that he was detained at a secret prison called Aynaghar, which is controlled by the Directorate General of Forces Intelligence.

In August 2024, after the July Revolution, he was released from Aynaghar after 9 years of disappearance. Moreover, his dismissal was revoked and he was granted retirement as a Lieutenant General, with the benefits of the rank.

== See also ==
- Bangladesh Jamaat-e-Islami

== Notes ==
Political offices
Preceded by Abbas Ali Khan	Emir of Bangladesh Jamaat-e-Islami; 1992–2000	Succeeded by Motiur Rahman Nizami
