= Abdur Rahim (scholar) =

Bangladeshi politician and Islamic scholar (1918–1987)

Mawlana Muhammad Abdur Rahim

Emir of Jamaat-e-Islami East Pakistan
- In office 1956–1960
- Preceded by: Abul A'la Maududi
- Succeeded by: Ghulam Azam

Personal details
- Born: 2 March 1918 Pirojpur, Bakerganj, Bengal Presidency, British India.
- Died: 1 October 1987 (aged 69) Dhaka, Bangladesh
- Party: Jamaat-e-Islami
- Spouse: Khairunnesa
- Children: 15
- Education: Alia Madrasa of Calcutta
- Occupation: Dawah
- Profession: Writer, translator, politician

Muhammad Abdur Rahim (Note: Bengali: মুহাম্মদ আবদুর রহীম) (2 March 1918 – 1 October 1987) was a Bangladeshi Islamic scholar and politician who was one of the first promoters of Jamaat-e-Islami East Pakistan.

He translated several books written by prominent Islamic scholars such as Abul A'la Maududi and Yusuf al-Qaradawi into Bengali and he wrote widely on the fundamentals of Islam in both Urdu and Bengali.

== Early life ==
Muhammad Abdur Rahim was born in the village of Shialkathi into a prominent family of Pirojpur District in Bangladesh. His clan was descended from Sheikh Baijeed, a Persian Dervish. His father was Haji Khabiruddin and mother Aklimunnessa. He was fourth among the twelve children in the family. Prominent among his brothers was his eldest brother A. T. M Abdul Wahid, a graduate from Alia Madrasa of Calcutta and a well known literary figure. Two of his brothers, M. A Karim and M. A Sattar, are also well-known writers.

== Education ==
After completing first four years of education at the village mosque beside his home, he was admitted into the Sharshina Aliya Madrasa in 1934. In 1938, Abdur Rahim graduated with merit from the Sharsina Aliya Madrassah, after which he was admitted into Aliya Madrasa of Calcutta (now the Aliah University) where he passed his Fazil and Kamil exams in 1940 and 1942, respectively.

== Role in Jamaat-e-Islami ==
Abdur Rahim used to receive the magazine Tarjamanul Qur'an, edited by Abul A'la Maududi, when he was a student at the Aliya Madrasa. Deeply influenced by this magazine and other writings of Syed Abul A'la Maududi, Abdur Rahim participated in the All-Indian conference of Jamaat-e-Islami held in Allahabad in 1946, at which he became acquainted with many of the leaders of the Jamaat. He subsequently joined the organization during the 1946–47 session.

Abdur Rahim was one of four people who started to work in Dhaka to establish Jamaat-e-Islami in Bangladesh. The others were Rafi Ahmed Indori, Khurshid Ahmed Bhat and Qari Jalil Ashrafi Nadwi. In 1955, Abdur Rahim was elected Ameer of East Pakistan Jamaat-e-Islami. In 1970, he became Nayeb-e-Ameer (vice chairman or vice president) of Jamaat-e-Islami Pakistan, while Ghulam Azam was elected the new Ameer of Jamaat-e-Islami East Pakistan Branch.

Abdur Rahim was the first elected leader of Jamaat-e-Islami Bangladesh. During the Bangladesh Liberation War of 1971, he refused to join the East Pakistan Central Peace Committee and asked Maulana Mawdudi not to support the Pakistani military regime. Abdur Rahim was stranded in Pakistan after the outbreak of the war and was only able to return to Bangladesh in 1974. During the period 1971 to 1975, Jamaat was banned from being involved with politics in Bangladesh. In 1979, Jamaat was allowed to participate in politics.

Abdur Rahim was instrumental in bringing various Islamic political parties together under the banner of the Islamic Democratic League (IDL), which won 20 seats in the parliamentary elections held on 18 February 1979.

== Books ==
Abdur Rahim wrote many books in his lifetime. Some of his books include:

1. Al-Qurane’r Aloke Unnoto Jiboner Adorsho [The Ideal of An Improved Way of Life in the Light of the Holy Quran, 1980]
2. Ajker Chintadhara (The Trends of Today's Thinking, 1980)
3. Hadith Sharif (3 volumes)
4. Hadith Shongkoloner Itihash
5. Pashchatto Shobbhotar Darshonik Bhitti (the Philosophical Basis of the West's civilization, 1984)
6. Al-Quraner Nobuuet O Risalat [1984]
7. Al-Quraner Aloke Shirk O Towheed [1983]
8. Al-Quraner Rashtro O Shorkar [1988]
9. Islamer Zakat Bidhan (1982–1986)- translation of book by Yusuf Al Qaradawi
10. Bingsho Shotabdir Jahliyat (1982–1986) - translation of book by Sayyid Qutb
11. Tafheemul Quran, 19 volumes- translation of book by Maududi
12. Sunnat O Bidaat

== Death ==
On 29 September 1987, Abdur Rahim became ill and was admitted to a hospital on 30 September. Abdur Rahim died on 1 October 1987 in Dhaka.

== Notes ==
Political offices
Preceded by Abul A'la Maududi	Emir of Jamaat-e-Islami East Pakistan; 1956–1960	Succeeded by Ghulam Azam
