= Islamic Democratic League =

Bangladeshi political alliance

Islamic Democratic League ইসলামী গণতান্ত্রিক লীগ
- Leader: Abdur Rahim
- Founder: Abdur Rahim; Saad Ahmed
- Founded: 1976
- Dissolved: 1979
- Succeeded by: Bangladesh Jamaat-e-Islami (mostly)
- Ideology: Islamism; Conservatism (Bangladeshi)
- National affiliation: Bangladesh Muslim League (1979)
- Jatiya Sangsad (1979): 20 / 300

The Islamic Democratic League (Bengali: ইসলামী গণতান্ত্রিক লীগ) was a political alliance in Bangladesh that brought together various Islamist parties on a single platform. The alliance was formed ahead of the second national election of 1979, where it succeeded in winning 6 seats in the Jatiya Sangsad. This marked the first major effort at uniting Bangladesh's Islamist political groups under one banner. However, soon after its formation, disagreements emerged among the member parties regarding the alliance’s future direction and leadership. As a result, the coalition was unable to maintain unity and eventually disbanded.

== History ==
The Islamic Democratic League was established in 1976 by Abdur Rahim and Saad Ahmad. The party had former members of the East Pakistani wing of Jamaat-e-Islami Pakistan, which would eventually form the Bangladesh Jamaat-e-Islami. Following the Independence of Bangladesh, religion based political parties, like Jamaat-e-Islami, were banned. In the 1979 election, for the 2nd Jatiya Sangsad, six members of the party were elected to Parliament. In the same year, the government of Bangladesh revoked the ban on religion based parties which legalized Jamaat-e-Islami. Many members of Islamic Democratic League returned to their former party.
