= Centre for Studies in Social Sciences, Calcutta =

Research institute in Calcutta, India

- Type: Premier social science research institute.
- Established: 1973
- Affiliations: Jadavpur University, ICSSR
- Chairman: Prof. Suranjan Das
- Director: Prof. Rosinka Chaudhuri
- Location: Baishnabghata Patuli Township, Kolkata, West Bengal, India; 22.4743°N 88.3923°E
- Campus: urban
- Website: Official website

Centre for Studies in Social Sciences, Calcutta (CSSSC) is a social science and humanities research and teaching institute in Kolkata, West Bengal, India.

== History ==
Established in 1973 jointly by the Indian Council of Social Science Research and Government of West Bengal, the Centre is one of the top social sciences think tanks of India. The centre was founded by Professor S. Nurul Hasan, when he was the education minister of India. Professor Barun De was appointed as its first director.

== Academics ==
=== Centre ===
The centre specializes in post-colonial, subaltern studies and cultural studies research.

=== Museum ===
The museum, called Jadunath Sarkar Resource Centre and Museum, houses an extensive collection of vernacular medium primary and secondary literature.

=== Research ===
They have various journals published consistently. They also feature a scholarly journal in collaboration with Sage Publications known as the Media Watch.

== Administration ==
The Centre is administered by a chairman, director and registrar.

== Location ==
Initially located in Jadunath Bhavan, the former residence of Sir Jadunath Sarkar at 10, Jadunath Sarkar Road (earlier Lake Terrace), Calcutta, the research centre is now located in a new building in Patuli, Calcutta. The resource centre and museum continue to remain in the historian's former residence.

== Notable faculty (past and present) ==
- Amiya Bagchi
- Partha Chatterjee
- Dipesh Chakrabarty
- Barun De
- Amitav Ghosh
- Ramchandra Guha
- Sugata Marjit
- Gyanendra Pandey
- Surajit Chandra Sinha
- Tapati Guha-Thakurta
- Maidul Islam
