= Khurshid Ahmed =

Khurshid Ahmed or Ahmad may refer to:

- Chaudhary Khurshid Ahmed (1934–2020), Indian politician and lawyer from Haryana
- Khursheed Ahmad (1956–2007) Pakistani singer
- Khurshid Hasan Khurshid (1924–1988), secretary of Muhammad Ali Jinnah
- Khurshid Ahmad (scholar) (1932–2025), Pakistani economist, writer and Islamic activist
- Khurshid Ahmed (cricketer) (born 1934), Pakistani cricketer
