= Ibn Sina Medical College =

Private medical school in Dhaka, Bangladesh

- ইবনে সিনা মেডিকেল কলেজ
- Logo of Ibn Sina Medical College
- Type: Private medical school
- Established: 2005
- Academic affiliations: University of Dhaka
- Principal: Dr.Sajed Abdul Khalque Principal & Head of the Department of Ophthalmology , IBN SINA MEDICAL COLLEGE HOSPITAL.
- Academic staff: 89 (2015)
- Students: 311 (2015)
- Location: Kallyanpur, Mirpur, Dhaka, Bangladesh; 23.7789°N 90.3621°E
- Campus: Urban
- Language: English
- Website: ismc.ac.bd

Ibn Sina Medical College (ISMC) (Bengali: ইবনে সিনা মেডিকেল কলেজ) is a private medical school in Bangladesh, established in 2005. It is located in the Kallyanpur area of Mirpur Model Thana, in Dhaka. It is affiliated with University of Dhaka as a constituent college.

It offers a five-year course of study leading to a Bachelor of Medicine, Bachelor of Surgery (MBBS) degree. A one-year internship after graduation is compulsory for all graduates. The degree is recognised by the Bangladesh Medical and Dental Council.

The college's 14-story building also houses a teaching hospital with 250 beds. Construction is underway on a second, 16-story hospital on campus that will add 500 beds. Bangladesh Journal of Medical Science is the official journal of the college.

== History ==
Ibn Sina Medical College is a non-profit institution of Ibn Sina Trust, named after Ibn Sina, a Persian philosopher, physician and medical scientist.

== Campus ==
The college is located in the Kallyanpur area of Mirpur Model Thana, in Dhaka. The college's 14-story building also houses a teaching hospital with 250 beds. Construction is underway on a second, 16-story hospital on campus that will add 500 beds.

== Organization and administration ==
The college is affiliated with University of Dhaka as a constituent college. The principal is A. N. M. Zia-Ur Rahman.

List of Principals of Ibn Sina Medical College

Principal	Notes	Held Office
Prof. Md. Abdur Rub Bhuiyan	MBBS, DMRT, Commonwealth Medicine Fellow, University of Liverpool, Uk	01.12.2003–31.12.2008
Prof. Md. Abdul Bari	MBBS, MPH, (Acting Principal)	01.01.2009–31.01.2009
Prof. Mohammed Nuruzzaman	MBBS, MCPS, MS, FICS, Brigadier General & Advisor Specialist (Retd.)	01.02.2009–24.08.2011
Prof. Mahfuzur Rahman Khan Chowdhury	MBBS, PhD (Acting Principal)	25.08.2011–05.09.2011
Prof. A. N. M. Zia-Ur-Rahman	MBBS, FCPS, FICS, Trained in Gastroenterology (Japan)	6.09.2011–present

== Academics ==
The college offers a five-year course of study, approved by the Bangladesh Medical and Dental Council (BMDC), leading to a Bachelor of Medicine, Bachelor of Surgery (MBBS) degree from Dhaka University. After passing the final professional examination, there is a compulsory one-year internship. The internship is a prerequisite for obtaining registration from the BMDC to practice medicine. In October 2014, the Ministry of Health and Family Welfare capped admission and tuition fees at private medical colleges at 1,990,000 Bangladeshi taka (US$25,750 as of 2014) total for their five-year courses.

Admission for Bangladeshis to the MBBS programme at all medical colleges in Bangladesh (government and private) is conducted centrally by the Directorate General of Health Services (DGHS). It administers a written multiple choice question exam simultaneously throughout the country. Candidates are admitted based primarily on their score on this test, although grades at Secondary School Certificate (SSC) and Higher Secondary School Certificate (HSC) level also play a part. As of July 2014, the college is allowed to admit 65 students annually.

Bangladesh Journal of Medical Science, which is Scopus listed, is the official journal of the college. It is an open access journal, published quarterly. It accepts original research articles, review articles, interesting case reports, and short communications containing significant findings. Submissions should not have been published previously, and should not be submitted to multiple publications concurrently.

== List of Honors Student ==
ISMC-12: Dr. Mahmudul Hasan Riad

ISMC-13: Dr. Nishat Tasnim

ISMC-14: Dr. Selina Akter, Dr. Tamima Tarin Zohora, Mustafijur Rahman, Dr.Sadeed Hossain,

ISMC-15: None

ISMC-16: Dr. Afroze Mitu

== See also ==
- List of medical colleges in Bangladesh
