= Right to clothing =

Human right

The right to adequate clothing, or the right to clothing, is recognized as a human right in various international human rights instruments; this, together with the right to food and the right to housing, are parts of the right to an adequate standard of living as recognized under Article 11 of the International Covenant on Economic, Social and Cultural Rights (ICESCR). The right to clothing is similarly recognized under Article 25 of the Universal Declaration of Human Rights (UDHR).

== Beneficiaries ==
The right to clothing forms an aspect of the right to an adequate standard of living, and as such, is regarded as something that needs to be ensured so as to prevent people from living below the poverty line. Indeed, being ill-clothed is emblematic of acute poverty:

We see it in the shivering or sweltering discomfort of 'beggars,' the homeless, the drug dependent and the 'derelict,' the elderly, the invalided, the 'street kid' or the just plain poor. Their plight has provoked condemnation, blame, disgust and derision, but religious, moral and secular creeds have in contrast exhorted us to respond with love, charity, mercy, with empathy and in a spirit of justice.

— Dr Stephen James, A Forgotten Right? The Right to Clothing in International Law

To illustrate how far-reaching the right to clothing potentially is, Dr Stephen James has provided a non-exhaustive list of beneficiaries of the right to minimum clothing. Included on this list are those sections of society that suffer the greatest from a lack of clothing, such as:

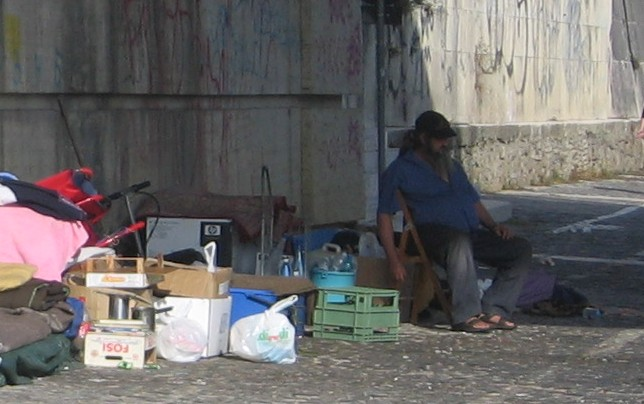
The homeless are a section of society that suffer greatly from a lack of adequate clothing.

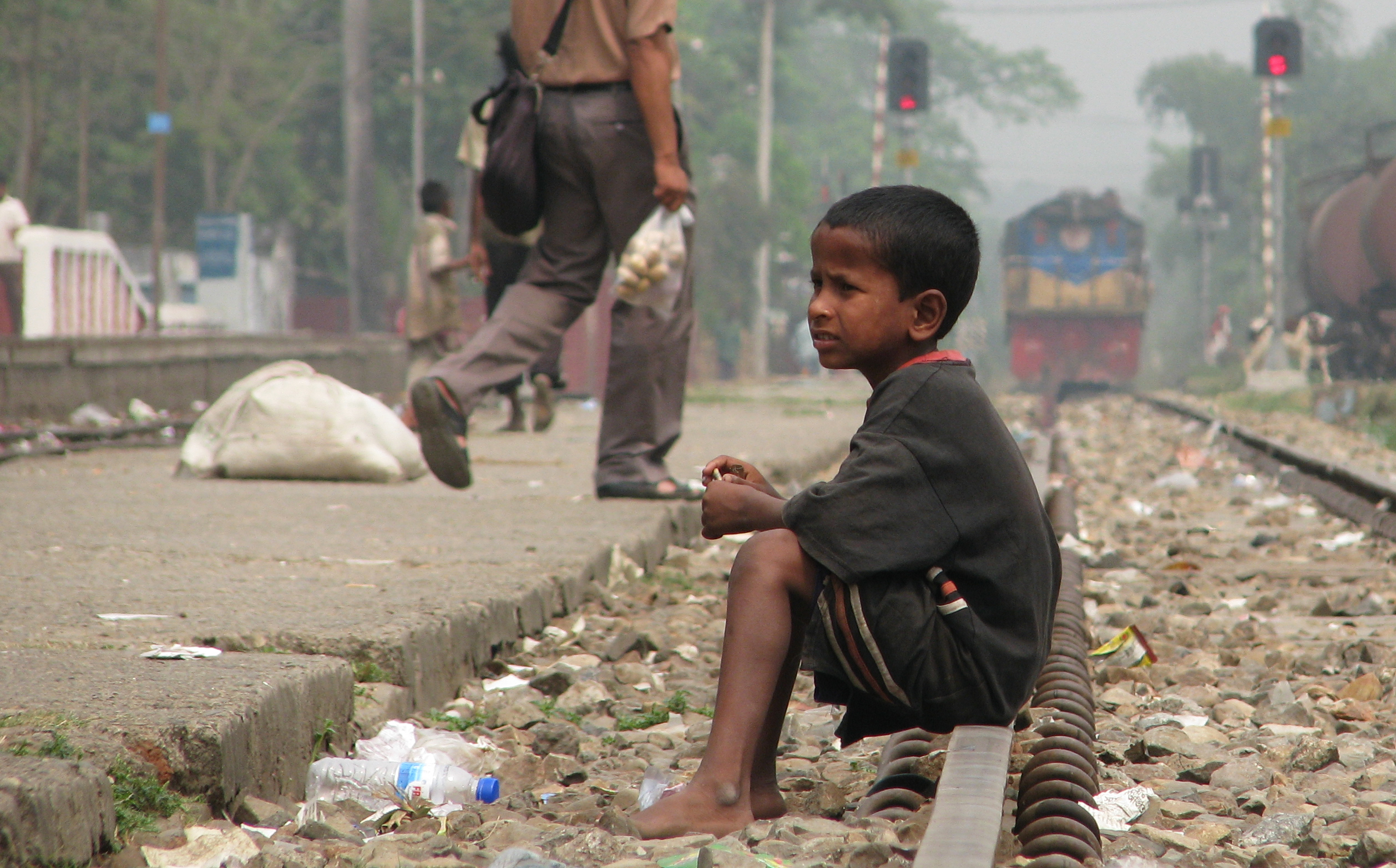
Street children also suffer greatly.

- The less-fortunate, including the unemployed, under-employed and working poor;
- Pensioners and others dependent on social security;
- The homeless and others in inadequate shelter;
- Those in emergency accommodation (for example, women's refuges), whether of a state or private character (including charitable accommodation);
- The elderly, whether in privately owned or rented accommodation, or state, commercial or charitable nursing homes, hospitals and hospices;
- Persons suffering from serious mental illness or from intellectual or physical disabilities (whether the live at home independently, with family members or others, or in Community Residential Units, half-way houses, public or private hospitals and other institutions);
- Children and adolescents, especially orphans and juvenile offenders in foster care, state institutions or detention centres;
- The ill and injured in hospitals (or rehabilitation centres), including those being treated for alcoholism and other drug-related dependencies;
- Prisoners, on remand or otherwise;
- Workers in hazardous industries (for instance, chemical manufacturing and mining industries), or working under generally oppressive conditions (for example, sweatshops), whose lives or health depend on protective clothing (including child workers);
- Indigenous persons living in impoverished conditions;
- Refugees, asylum-seekers, and migrant workers (especially those working in the black market illegally); and,
- The victims of natural disasters, civil unrest, civil and international war (including prisoners of war), genocidal persecutions and other traumatic dislocations.

== Recognition ==
The lack of discussion about the right to clothing has led to uncertainty as to the ambit of the right and how much clothing is required. Matthew Craven notes that a minimum level of clothing is what is required to be provided; it is of "paramount importance not least because at minimum levels it represents a question of survival." This requirement of a "minimum" or "adequate" standard is mirrored in reports from the UN Committee on the Rights of the Child (CRC) and a report from the Consortium For Street Children, as well as a number of General Comments from the Committee on Economic, Social and Cultural Rights (CESCR) as regards the elderly, disabled, and workers. There is, however, no indication as to what such a "minimum" or "adequate" standard entails: indeed, only rarely has the CESCR questioned a party state of the ICESCR on its performance with respect to the right to clothing.

There has been limited academic commentary on the ambit of the right to clothing with regards to refugees. James Hathaway has argued that refugees should have access to clothing that suitable for the climate and is sufficient for any work or other roles they may wish to undertake. Furthermore, they should not be compelled to wear any sort of clothing that would lead to social stigma or discrimination as foreigners. On the other hand, however, should refugees choose to wear clothing that is representative of their culture, country of origin or society, they are protected under Article 27 of the International Covenant on Civil and Political Rights to do so. The Committee on Economic, Social and Cultural Rights has tended towards applying context-specific interpretations on what is an adequate standard of clothing; so far, the right in its general sense has not yet been considered in a general comment.

The right to clothing has been recognised domestically for millennia – at least partially – but has received very little recognition on the international scene. It is not clear why there is a lack of recognition; one author has suggested that the lack of elaboration is due to the variations in cultural needs and wants. However, this explanation has been regarded as "not plausible": Dr James notes that "Cultural, environmental and economic variations in 'needs and wants' are surely as marked with regard to housing, health as they are in relation to clothing, but this has not prevented detailed elaboration of those rights in international law." Matthew Craven concluded in 1995 that:

The right to clothing, although specifically included in the Covenant, has had little attention either from the Committee [CESCR] or independent commentators. As far as the Committee is concerned, no reference to clothing is to be found in reporting guidelines, and only the occasional question has been asked of States by individual members. The impression given is that clothing is not a matter in which the State may exercise a great deal of control, nor one that the Committee feels is of great importance.

— Matthew Craven, The international covenant on economic, social, and cultural rights : a perspective on its development

However, Dr James has remarked: "...none of us can be complacent that we will not find ourselves [...] in need of adequate clothing. The right is of great practical importance. It is an essential subsistence right, not an embellishment or a legal absurdity". He also called for further discussion and academic commentary, arguing:

We must remember the right to adequate clothing when examining the right to an adequate standard of living in international law. The health, dignity and very lives of a range of vulnerable people [...] can be at risk when they are not adequately clothed. [...] [I]t will be useful to explore the possibilities that lie in reasoning by analogy from CESCR jurisprudence on other rights within Article 11 of the ICESCR. After all, the CESCR has begun to develop criteria, in some cases quite detailed, regarding required standards in relation to 'adequate' housing, health, food, water and so on. There is no reason why a similar approach might not be undertaken in relation to the right to adequate clothing.

— Dr Stephen James, A Forgotten Right? The Right to Clothing in International Law

== Interaction between the right to clothing and other human rights ==
As the right to clothing concerns such a fundamental aspect of humanity, it naturally interacts with other human rights that are contained within various human rights instruments.

=== Right to life ===
Everyone has the essential right to life, as confirmed under Article 3 of the UDHR. However, if people are not adequately clothed, they are far more exposed to the elements. Without warm clothing, a person may well die from hypothermia during a cold winter; clothing that is inappropriately warm, on the other hand, could contribute to heat stroke, dehydration and exhaustion during summer or in tropical climates. Furthermore, inadequate clothing could increase exposure to ultraviolet rays; aggravate allergies and skin conditions; and worsen pre-existing medical conditions.

Additionally, access to medical care – similarly confirmed under Article 25 of the UDHR as well as Article 12 of the ICESCR – can be impeded by inadequate access to clothing, particularly if the access to therapeutic clothing or orthopedic footwear is unavailable or prohibitively expensive.

=== Right to freedom of expression ===
Wearing clothes – or more accurately, choosing which clothes to wear – is, for many people, an important part of expression as confirmed under Article 19 of the UDHR. Persons with serious disabilities may be dress inappropriately, denying their desired expression. Furthermore, being forced to wear dirty, ripped, ill-fitting and even extremely outdated clothing may invite ridicule and contempt and inflict shame. This can be particularly true with school children – parents may be reluctant to consider sending a child to school as a result of ridicule and shame brought through the clothing the child wears. A distinction should be drawn, however, between those who are forced to wear ripped, ill-fitting or extremely outdated clothing and those who consciously choose to wear such clothes as a 'fashion statement'.

=== Right to freedom from discrimination ===
The clothes that people choose to wear can identify a great number of things about a person: religious affiliations, ethnicity, national or political identity, culture, or race. Arguably, the clothes that an impoverished person wears can indicate their poverty. This sign of poverty or poorer economic status can be a cause of discrimination and of vilification. Additionally, clothing which is culturally distinctive or denotes religious affiliation could provoke discrimination and lead to a denial of social, economic, or political opportunities.

=== Right to freedom from cruel, inhuman or degrading treatment or punishment ===
There is a large potential for "abuses of trust, for humiliations and various physical abuses in medical and institutional settings, especially in relation to women and children, the disabled and elderly." If a person is denied access to adequate clothing – especially essential clothes, such as undergarments – it is possible that they may be rendered vulnerable to cruel, inhuman, or degrading treatment or punishment under the ambit of Article 5 of the UDHR. Such denial would include forcibly taking clothes, and is of particular importance in the context of detention and prisons: "[o]ne can literally be left naked in the midst of power, a tragic condition [...] seen too often in prisons, in war and in concentration camps." Examples of such abuses in Abu Ghraib prison in Iraq and Guantanamo Bay have found to have caused serious mental illnesses, including post-traumatic stress disorder, resulting from forcing prisoners to strip naked and parade in front of female guards, as well as male detainees being forced to wear female underwear.

=== Gender expression ===
For transgender and gender-nonconforming people, the choice of clothing is a fundamental medium for affirming and communicating their gender identity. Principle 19 of the Yogyakarta Principles explicitly recognizes that the freedom of expression encompasses the right to express one's identity through dress.

== See also ==
- Human rights
- International law
- International human rights instruments
- Economic, social and cultural rights
- International Covenant on Economic, Social and Cultural Rights
- Right to an adequate standard of living
- Right to food
- Right to housing
- Right to education
- Right to work
- Welfare rights
