= Batisha Union =

Batisha বাতিসা
- Union
- 10 Batisha Union Parishad
- Location of Batisha Union in Bangladesh Batisha (Bangladesh)
- Coordinates: 23°12′N 91°18.5′E
- Country: Bangladesh
- Division: Chittagong
- District: Comilla
- Upazila: Chauddagram Upazila
- Time zone: UTC+6 (BST)
- Postal Code: 3551
- Website: https://batishaup.comilla.gov.bd

Batisha is a union within Chauddagram Upazila in the Comilla district of Bangladesh.

== Area ==
The area of Batisha Union covers 16.41 square kilometres.

== Demographics ==
The population of Batisha Union is 25,725 people, with 12,663 men and 13,062 women.

== Geography ==
Batisha Union is situated in the south-central part of Chauddagram Upazila. To the north lies Chauddagram Municipality, to the northwest Munshirhat Union, to the west Kankapait Union, to the south Cheora Union, and to the east the Indian state of Tripura.

A significant amount of glass sand deposit was found in this area. This special type of sand is suitable for glass making because of its high silica content.

== Administrative structure ==
Batisha Union is the 10th Union Parishad under Chauddagram Upazila. The administrative activities of this union fall under Chauddagram Police Station. It is part of the 259th electoral area of the National Parliament, Comilla-11. The villages within this union are:

- Anandapur
- Atogram
- Basantapur
- Batisha
- Boriya
- Chandkara
- Daiyara
- Dalba
- Debipur
- Durgapur
- Jamukora
- Kalikapur
- Kaliksar
- Kuliara
- Ludiara
- Nankara
- Paragram
- Patanondi
- Sonapur
- Ullapara

== Education ==
The literacy rate in Batisa Union stands at 58.14%.

== Educational institutions ==
Higher Secondary School

- Chandkora Sakadar Ali Secondary School
- Batisha Secondary School
- Batisha Secondary Girls School
- Kuliara High School
- Ludiara Jahir Ahmaed Girls High School
- Basantapur Islamia Alim Madrasah
- Boshkora Islamia Alim Madrasah
- Patanondi Mohammad Ullah Dakhil Madrasah

== Transport ==
Batisa Union has 25 kilometers of paved roads and 20 kilometers of unpaved roads.

== Canals and Rivers ==
Nunjuri Canal: The nearly 7-kilometer-long Nunjuri Canal flows from the Lagunandan mountain range in the Indian state of Tripura and joins the Dakatia River in the west.

== Market ==
- Batisha Bazar
- Amjader Bazar
- Atogram Bazar
- Nankara Bazar
- Akota Bazar

== See also ==
- Chauddagram Upazila
- Comilla District
