= Asma Khan =

Indian-born chef, restaurateur, and cookbook author

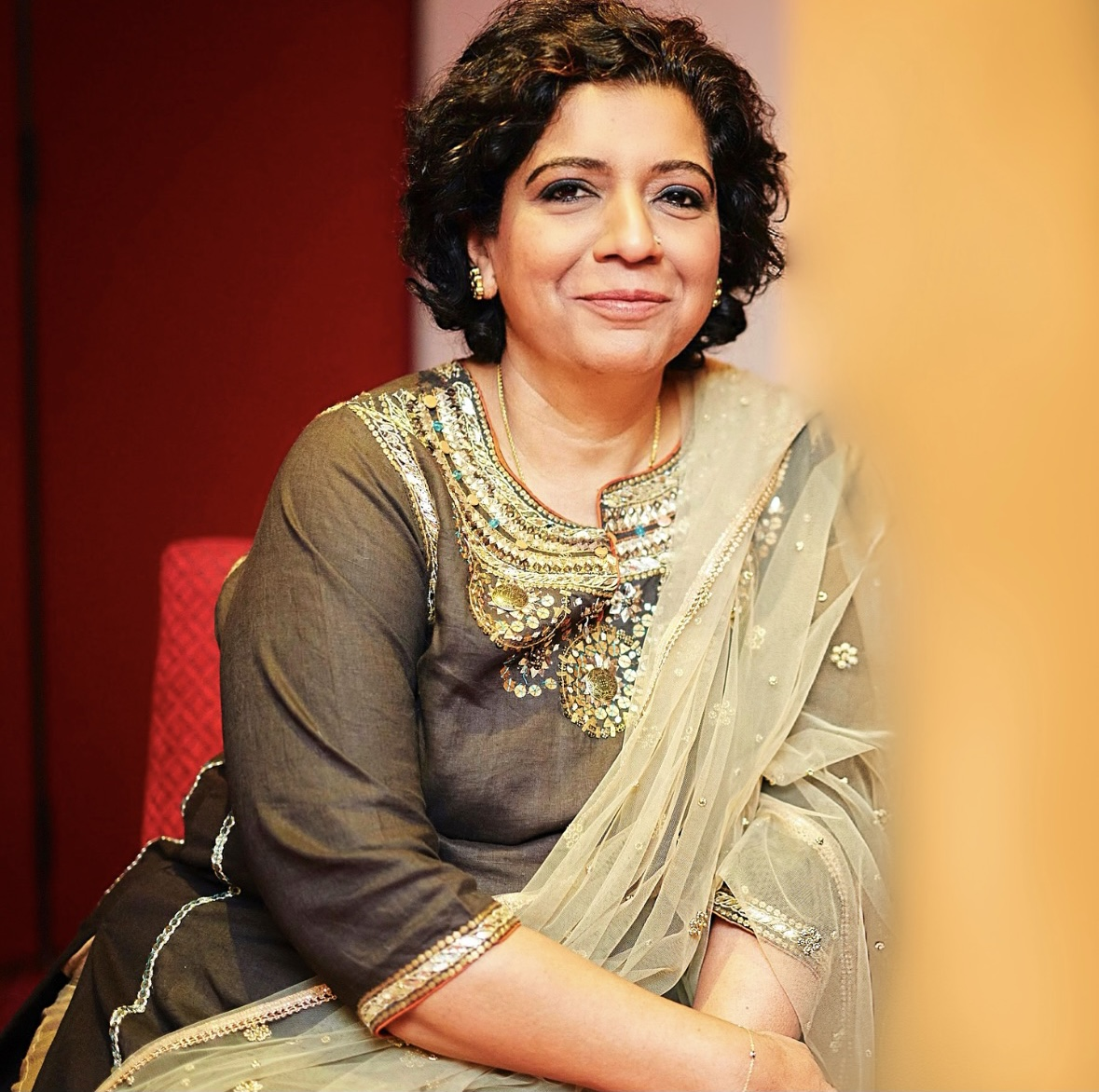
- Khan in 2023
- Born: July 1969 (age 56–57); Calcutta, West Bengal, India
- Culinary career
- Current restaurant: Darjeeling Express

Asma Khan (born July 1969) is an Indian-born British restaurateur and cookbook author. She owns Darjeeling Express restaurant in London's Soho and was profiled on the sixth season of the documentary series Chef's Table.

In 2019 Business Insider named Khan number 1 on their list of "100 Coolest People in Food and Drink". In 2022 the World Food Programme named her a chef advocate and in 2024 Time named her one of the year's 100 most influential people.

== Early life and education ==
Khan was born in July 1969 and grew up in Calcutta. Her father is Rajput from western Uttar Pradesh. Khan’s paternal great-grandfather was Sir Muhammad Ahmad Said Khan, the Nawab of Chhatari, who belonged to a Muslim Rajput landed family and held political offices in British India and the princely State of Hyderabad. Her mother is from West Bengal and had a catering business in the 1970s and 1980s. Through her mother, Khan is also descended from Khan Bahadur Nawab Kazi Musharraf Hussain of Jalpaiguri, a Bengali lawyer, legislator, government minister, philanthropist and tea planter. According to Khan, her father and grandfather worked to unionize laborers in India. She has an older sister and a younger brother. Her family lamented the birth of a second daughter instead of the desired son. According to Khan "there is a deafening silence" in India about the disappointment a family feels at having a second daughter. She has said that she and her siblings were treated equally by her parents, and that she and her mother "made peace while I was still very young." Khan attended La Martiniere in Calcutta.

Khan had an arranged marriage and immediately afterward moved with her husband to Cambridge in 1991. She had never learned to cook and missed the dishes she had grown up eating. She first started learning to cook from an aunt who lived in Cambridge. After her aunt died, Khan returned to India for a visit of a few months to continue lessons with her mother and the family's cook. She told Francis Lam that learning to cook from her mother helped their relationship.

In 1996 her husband moved to SOAS University of London to teach, and Khan started studying law at King's College London. She graduated with a PhD in British Constitutional Law in 2012.

== Career ==
In 2012, after obtaining her PhD, Khan started offering a series of private supper clubs in her home for a dozen people for £35 each. Vivek Singh attended one and invited her to host a pop-up at his restaurant, The Cinnamon Club. Eventually the supper clubs grew to serving 45, and in 2015, after her family complained, she moved the supper clubs to a Soho pub, Sun and 13 Cantons, and started serving lunches instead. She struggled early on to lead her team of home cooks, mostly local immigrants working for the first time in a professional kitchen, but then a review by Fay Maschler helped bring in customers.

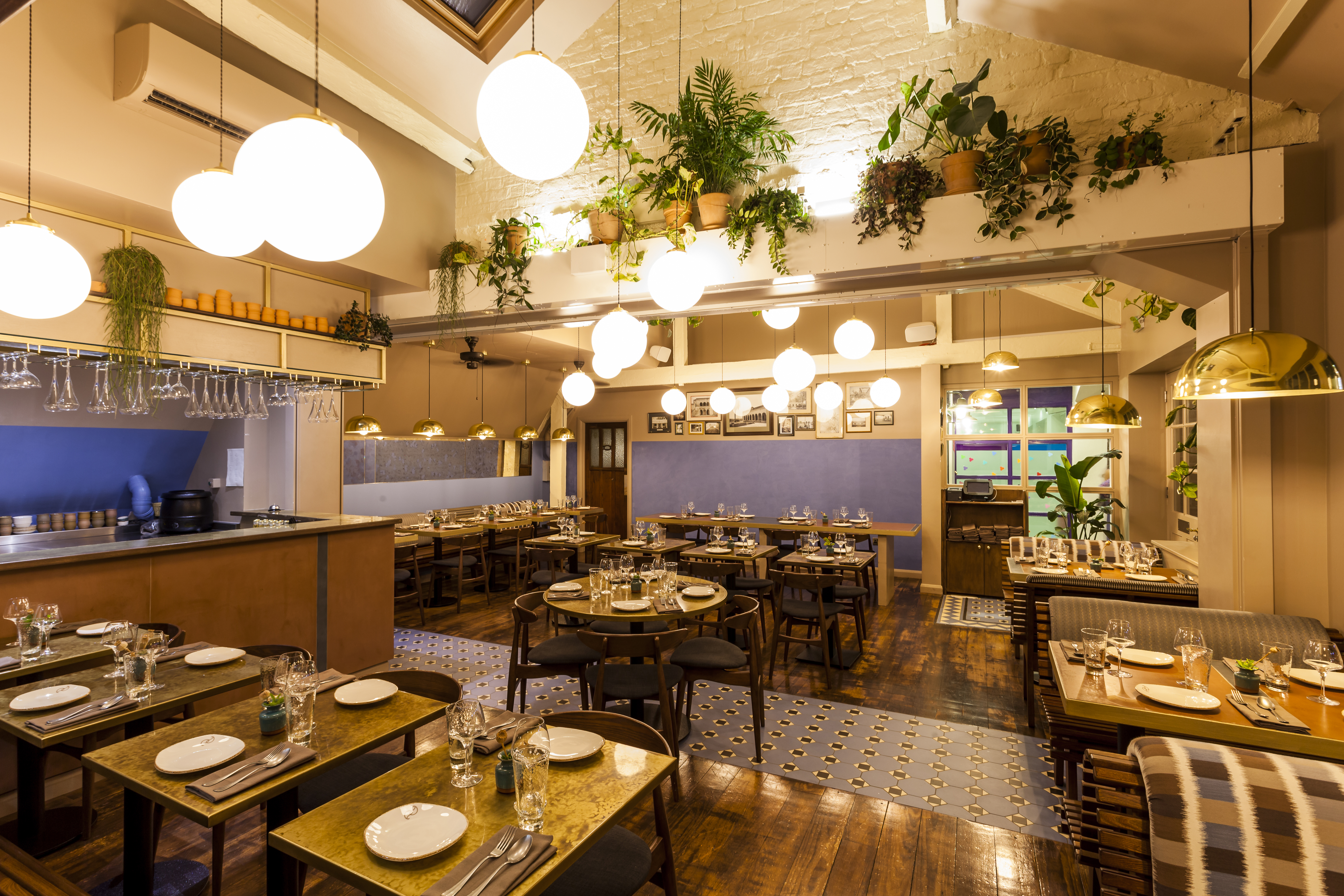
Interior of original Darjeeling Express

Simon Quayle, a regular customer and executive director of Shaftesbury, offered her the opportunity to compete for a lease in Soho. When an investor backed out, Khan's husband gave her the money she needed, although he disapproved of the business. Khan opened Darjeeling Express, a 56-seat location offering Indian Rajput and Bengali home cooking specialties, in 2017 in Soho. She named the restaurant after a train she rode as a child during summer holidays. Her team consisted of Asian immigrant women who all had full-time jobs and were never trained professionally; they worked for Khan on their days off but were able to cut back hours at their other jobs and eventually give them up altogether. Most of the all-female kitchen staff at the restaurant are second daughters. All are South Asian. Food & Wine called Darjeeling Express a "smash hit". Khan was profiled by the BBC in a short documentary.

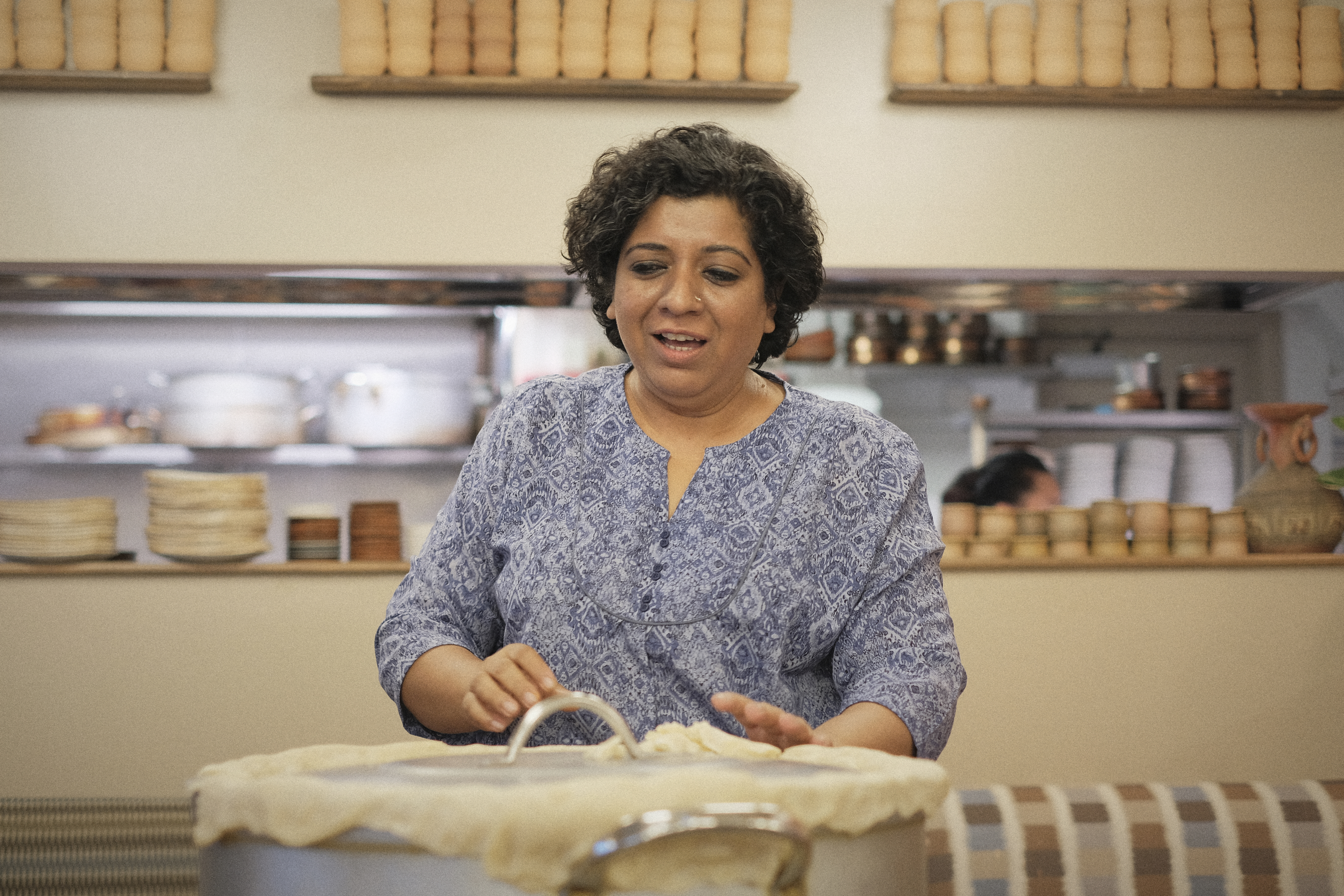
Khan, about to open a dum biryani

In 2018 her cookbook, Asma's Indian Kitchen, was published by Pavilion Books. The San Francisco Chronicle called it a "stellar debut". It was shortlisted for the 2018 World Gourmand award for Best Indian Cookbook.

Khan was approached by Brian McGinn, producer of Chef's Table, to be the first British chef profiled on the series. Filming started in London and India in July 2018 with Zia Mandviwalla directing. Khan recalls Mandviwalla, who was born in Mumbai and lives in New Zealand, "did not ask me pointless questions about my husband and marriage, I did not need to explain what my mother meant to me, she got it." The programme first aired in February 2019. Khan is the first British chef to be featured. The series' sixth season's theme is "the journey home". The season, which included Khan's episode, was nominated for an Emmy in the outstanding documentary section. According to Bloomberg it became difficult to get a reservation at Darjeeling Express after the series aired.

Business Insider named her number 1 on their 2019 list of "100 Coolest People in Food and Drink". Danny DeVito offered to invest in an expansion.

Khan closed the restaurant The Darjeeling Express in March 2020 during the coronavirus pandemic. By the end of the year she had reopened in Covent Garden in a 120-seat space serving tasting menus. Darjeeling Express operated out of this location until March 2022. Following a 6-month popup in The Pembroke, Khan opened the doors to the latest location of Darjeeling Express in Kingly Court off Carnaby Street, Soho, a 96-seat space next door to her first, 2017 restaurant. Khan has also been outspoken about the importance of her presence and the restaurant's in the cultural and social landscape in Europe.

On 6 March 2025, Khan released her third cookbook Monsoon: Delicious Indian Recipes for Every Day and Season.

== Philanthropy ==
On Sundays, when Darjeeling Express is closed, Khan offers free use of the premises to women who are aspiring chefs and restaurateurs who would like to host supper clubs. When Khan gave up the Soho space, she arranged with her landlord to allow Imad Alarnab, a Syrian refugee who had been running a pop-up restaurant, to use the space for the remainder of the lease.

Khan's restaurants support a non-profit, Second Daughters Fund, which encourages families in India to celebrate the births of second daughters by sending packages of sweet treats to be shared with neighbours.

In July 2019, to mark her 50th birthday, Khan traveled to Northern Iraq to open an all-women cafe for survivors of ISIS at the Essyan refugee camp.

== Recognition ==
In 2022, she was appointed the Chef Advocate for the United Kingdom (a WFP Goodwill Ambassador) by the UN World Food Programme and an Honorary Fellow of the Queen's College, Oxford. In 2024 she was named by Time to their list of the year's 100 most influential people. In 2024 she received the Johannes van Dam prize for her exceptional contribution to the sharing of knowledge of gastronomy.

== Personal life ==
Khan is married to Mushtaq, an academic. According to Khan, he is not a fan of her food, preferring simple dishes and finding hers too complex. The couple have two sons.
