= Kazi Zafar Ahmed =

Prime Minister of Bangladesh from 1989 to 1990

Kazi Zafar Ahmad
- কাজী জাফর আহমেদ
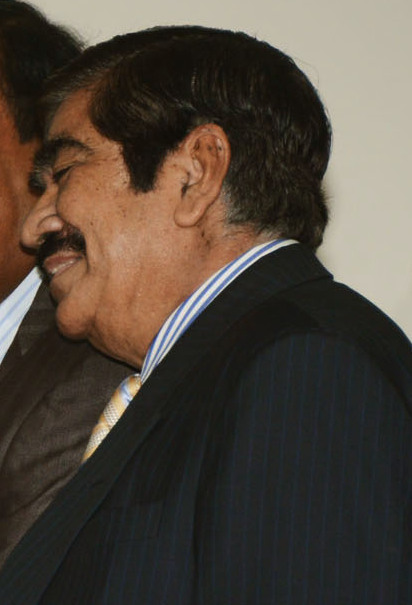
- Ahmed in 2013

8th Prime Minister of Bangladesh
- In office 12 August 1989 – 6 December 1990
- President: Hussain Mohammad Ershad
- Deputy: Shah Moazzem Hossain
- Preceded by: Moudud Ahmed
- Succeeded by: Khaleda Zia

Deputy Prime Minister of Bangladesh
- In office 27 March 1988 – 12 August 1989
- President: Hossain Mohammad Ershad
- Prime Minister: Moudud Ahmed
- Preceded by: Moudud Ahmed
- Succeeded by: Position Abolished
- In office 9 July 1986 – 10 August 1987
- President: Hossain Mohammad Ershad
- Prime Minister: Mizanur Rahman Chowdhury
- Preceded by: Jamal Uddin Ahmad
- Succeeded by: Shah Moazzem Hossain

Minister of Education
- In office 2 May 1990 – 6 December 1990
- Preceded by: Sheikh Shahidul Islam
- Succeeded by: Zillur Rahman Siddiqui
- In office 4 July 1978 – 11 October 1978
- Preceded by: Syed Ali Ahsan
- Succeeded by: Abdul Baten

Minister of Information and Broadcasting
- In office 10 December 1988 – 2 May 1990
- Prime Minister: Moudud Ahmed
- Preceded by: Mahbubur Rahman
- Succeeded by: Mizanur Rahman Shelley

Minister of Commerce
- In office 25 May 1986 – 31 December 1986
- Prime Minister: Mizanur Rahman Chowdhury
- Preceded by: Himself
- Succeeded by: Mohammad Abdul Munim
- In office 30 July 1985 – 23 March 1986
- Preceded by: Sultan Mahmud
- Succeeded by: Himself

Member of the Bangladesh Parliament for Comilla-12
- In office 7 May 1986 – 24 November 1995
- Preceded by: Ali Hossain Mia
- Succeeded by: Shamsuddin Ahmed

Personal details
- Born: 1 July 1939 Chauddagram, Bengal, British India
- Died: 27 August 2015 (aged 76) Dhaka, Bangladesh
- Party: Jatiya Party (1985–2013); Jatiya Party (Zafar) (2013–2015)
- Other political affiliations: National Awami Party (NAP) (1972-1974); United Peoples Party-UPP (1974-1985)
- Relatives: Kazi Zahirul Qayyum (paternal uncle)
- Education: University of Dhaka

Kazi Zafar Ahmad (/ˈkɑːzi ˈzɑːfɑːr ˈɑːxmɛd/; Bengali: কাজী জাফর আহমেদ; 1 July 1939 – 27 August 2015) was a Bangladeshi politician of the Jatiya Party, who was Prime Minister of Bangladesh from 1989 to 1990.

== Early life ==
Ahmed was born on 1 July 1939, in Kazi Bari, Cheora Chauddagram Upazila, Comilla, British India (now Bangladesh), the son of Cheora Kazi Bari. He passed the entrance examination from Khulna Zilla School in the first division in 1955. He later completed his Higher Secondary education from Rajshahi College in 1957 and went on to earn both his B.A. (Honours) and M.A. degrees in History from the University of Dhaka. Although he completed coursework for an MA in International Relations and an LLB, he could not sit for the final examinations as he was imprisoned.

== Early political career ==
=== East Pakistan Students' Union ===
He started his political career while studying at Rajshahi College by joining the East Pakistan Students' Union (now Bangladesh Students' Union). Later he was elected the Joint Secretary of the Rajshahi District unit of East Pakistan Students' Union. During his college days he also got associated with the Communist Party of East Pakistan. He worked to increase the organizational activity of Rajshahi District East Pakistan Students' Union. He also attended various regional and District Students' conference in North Bengal. During this he met Muhammad Shahidullah in the Ishwardi Students' conference.

After his admission in Dhaka University, he was elected the office secretary of the Central Committee of East Pakistan Students' Union in 1958. On 7 October 1958 Martial law was imposed throughout Pakistan and several political leaders were arrested. Zafar was in Khulna at that time. After the Martial law was declared he went in concealment of identity. He went to Comilla and began to teach there in a High School. He stayed there until June 1959.

== Political career ==
Ahmed was a Maoist, From 1962 to 1963, he served as the General Secretary of the East Pakistan Students' Union. In 1966, he joined the Maoist Communist Party and became a labour leader, mainly concentrating in organising the workers in Tongi industrial area. During the Bangladesh war of independence in 1971, he worked in favour of Mujibnagar government.

=== National Awami Party ===
After independence, he joined the National Awami Party of Maulana Bhashani and became its Secretary General. He supported the ideology of Islamic socialism by Maulana Bhashani. He declared that he would form a responsible opposition party.

=== United Peoples' Party ===
He formed the United Peoples' Party (UPP) on 17 November 1974 with Captain Abdul Halim Chowdhury. He worked with the People's Democratic Party under President Ziaur Rahman after he assumed the presidency through a referendum. Ahmed became Minister of Education.

=== Jatiya Party ===
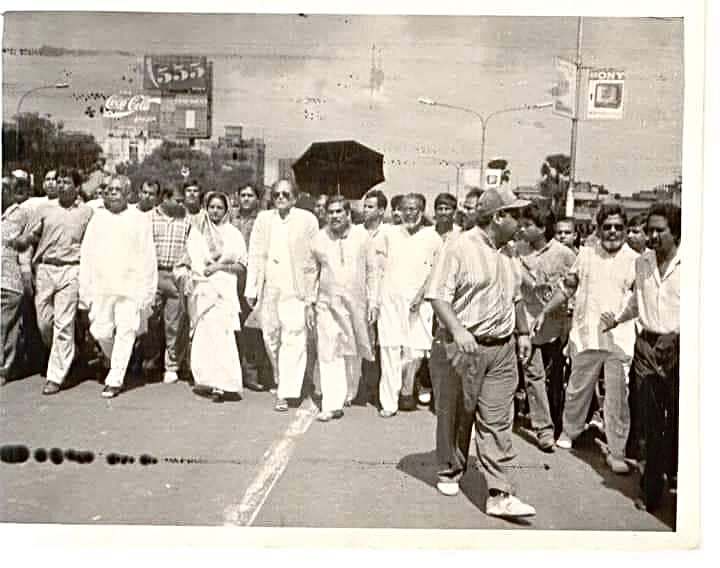
Chairman of Jatiya Party Mizanur Rahman Chowdhury leading a political rally along with Kazi Zafar Ahmed and Rowshan Ershad in Dhaka

Ahmed also played a leading role in the anti-military rule movement against President Hussain Muhammad Ershad. But the period since 1975 in Bangladesh witnessed realignment of politics and leaders leaving their old parties and joining new ones. Ahmed dissolved his UPP and joined President Ershad's Jatiya Party. On 3 July 1985, he was made a Minister in the cabinet of President Ershad. Ershad on 3 March 1988 made Ahmed the deputy prime minister under Prime Minister Moudud Ahmed. He defended the decision of Ershad to make Islam the state religion of Bangladesh as move against fundamentalism on 6 June 1988. He served in the Ershad Government as Minister of Commerce from 1986 to 1989. In August 1989, he was appointed prime minister replacing Moudud Ahmed who was made vice-president. He served as the prime minister from August 1989 to 6 December 1990. He fled to India after Ershad resigned from power. He became known as Sugar Zafar for his role in the theft of a sugar shipment. Ahmed criticised Ershad for joining the Bangladesh Awami League government in 1997 and created his own party called Jatiya Dal, which joined the opposition Bangladesh Nationalist Party. Ershad was imprisoned since he lost power and was freed in 1996 after Bangladesh Awami League came to power.

Ahmed was sentenced to 15 years imprisonment by a Dhaka court in November 1999 on corruption charges related to the misappropriation of funds meant for an orphanage. He moved to Australia and successfully applied for asylum. In Australia he was able to access government disability pension for the treatment of his kidney. John Howard, Prime Minister of Australia, called an inquiry into how Ahmed was able to secure asylum.

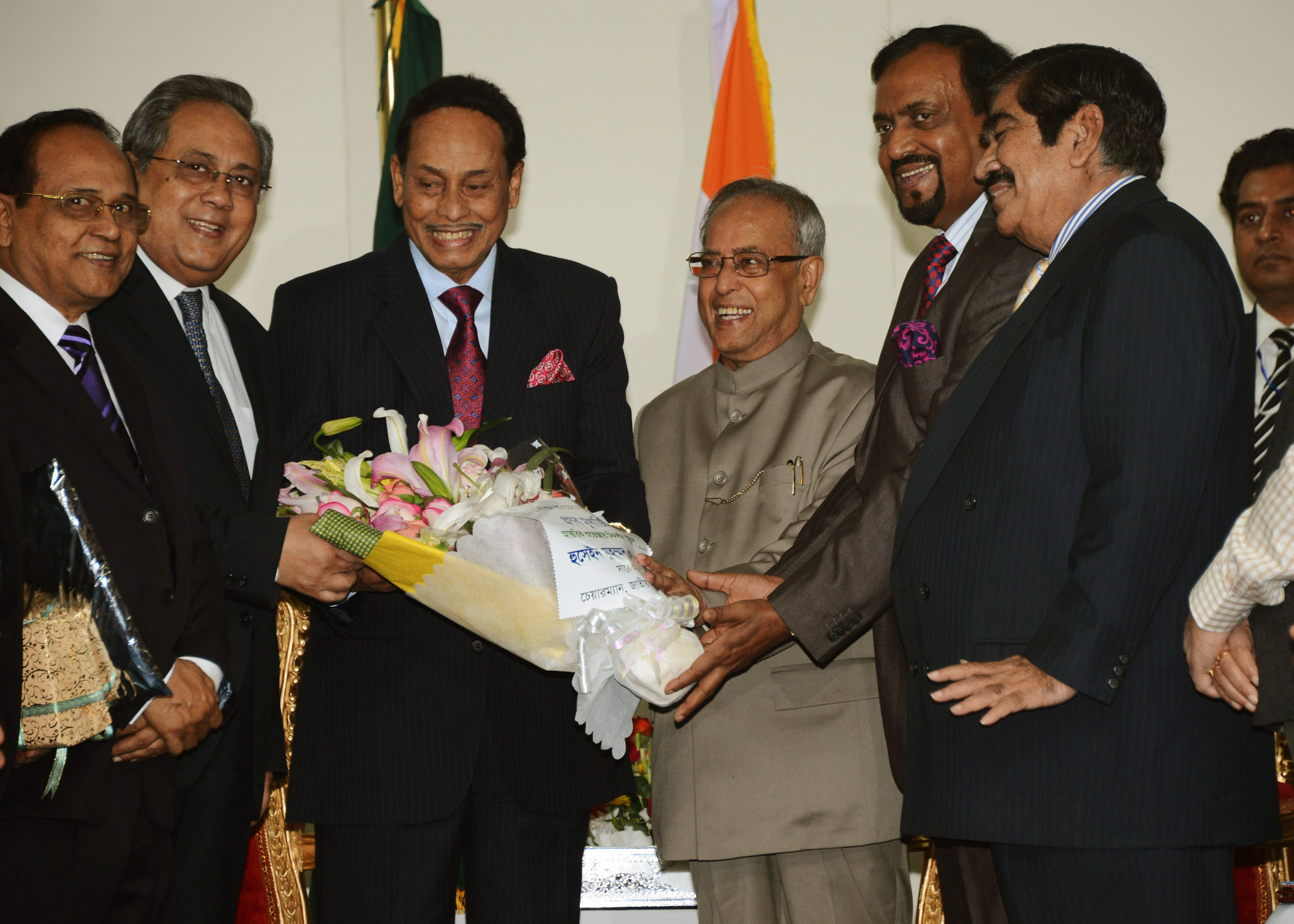
The Chairman of Jatiya Party, Bangladesh, Gen. HM Ershad along with Kazi Zafar Ahmed, A.B.M. Ruhul Amin Howlader, Anisul Islam Mahmud, Kazi Firoz Rashid calling on the President, Shri Pranab Mukherjee, at Dhaka, Bangladesh on March 04, 2013

Ahmed competed in the 2008 Bangladeshi general election from Comilla-11. Ahmed, the presidium member of Jatiya Party, criticised Ershad for agreeing to join the 2014 Bangladesh election organised by Bangladesh Awami League-led coalition government. On 5 May 2013, he went on the stage at a Hefajat-e Islam rally in Motijheel.

=== Jatiya Party (Zafar) ===
In 2013, amid internal conflict over joining the interim government ahead of the 2014 Bangladeshi general election, he was suspended from Jatiya Party by Ershad and a few hours later, Ahmed tried to expel Ershad from the Jatiya Party, after which he formed his own faction of Jatiya Party. Golam Moshi joined the Ahmed faction of Jatiya Party. In January 2014, he joined the Bangladesh Nationalist Party (BNP)-led 20-party alliance with his faction of Jatiya Party.

== Personal life ==
Ahmed was married to Momtaz Begum. They had three daughters, Kazi Joya Ahmed, Kazi Sonia Ahmed, and Kazi Rona Ahmed. In 1999–2000, he served as a visiting professor at the University of Western Sydney, where he taught South Asian subcontinental politics.

== Books ==
- আমার রাজনীতির ৬০ বছর জোয়ার-ভাটার কথন

== Death ==
Ahmed died on 27 August 2015 in United Hospital, Dhaka, Bangladesh.

Political offices
Preceded by Moudud Ahmed	Prime Minister of Bangladesh; 1989–1990	Succeeded by Khaleda Zia
