= Goharua =

Village in Bangladesh

Goharua is a village in Jodda Union in Nangalkot Upazila, Comilla District, Bangladesh.

== History ==
Goharua Hospital, a 20 bed hospital, was built in the early 2000s and but has not started operating as of 2020. The building is in a decayed state as it had been abandoned for more than a decade. In April 2020, during the COVID-19 pandemic in Bangladesh, an infected patient was kept in the hospital by Bangladesh Police. This was criticised by Aminul Haque of Bangladesh Human Rights Commission and Naem Nizam, Editor of Bangladesh Pratidin, who said the derelict hospital was an improper site for an isolation centre.
