= Henry Cotton =

Henry Cotton may refer to:

- Henry Egerton Cotton (1929–1993), first chancellor of Liverpool John Moores University and former Lord Lieutenant of Merseyside
- Sir Henry Cotton (civil servant) (1845–1915), British politician (also in India)
- Sir Henry Cotton (judge) (1821–1892), British judge (Lord Justice of Appeal), Privy Counsellor
- Henry Cotton (doctor) (1876–1933), American doctor
- Sir Henry Cotton (golfer) (1907–1987), English golfer
- Cotton Knaupp (Henry Antone Knaupp, 1889–1967), baseball player
- Henry Cotton (bishop) (c. 1545–1615), English bishop of Salisbury
- Harry Cotton (1882–1921), English footballer
- Henry Cotton (divine) (1789–1879), Anglo-Irish ecclesiastical historian
- Henry Cotton, British architect of the Sun and 13 Cantons public house, London
- Henry Cotton (cricketer) (1845–1907), New Zealand cricketer

== See also ==
- James Cotton (priest) (James Henry Cotton) (1780–1862), British clergyman and educationist
- James Cotton (James Henry Cotton) (1935–2017), American blues musician
