= Satbaria Union =

Satbaria Union may refer to:

- Satbaria Union, Chandanaish, a union in Chandanaish Upazila
- Satbaria Union, Keshabpur, a union in Keshabpur Upazila
- Satbaria Union (Cumilla District), a union in Nangolkot Upazila
