= Nangalkot Upazila =

Nangalkot নাঙ্গলকোট
- Upazila
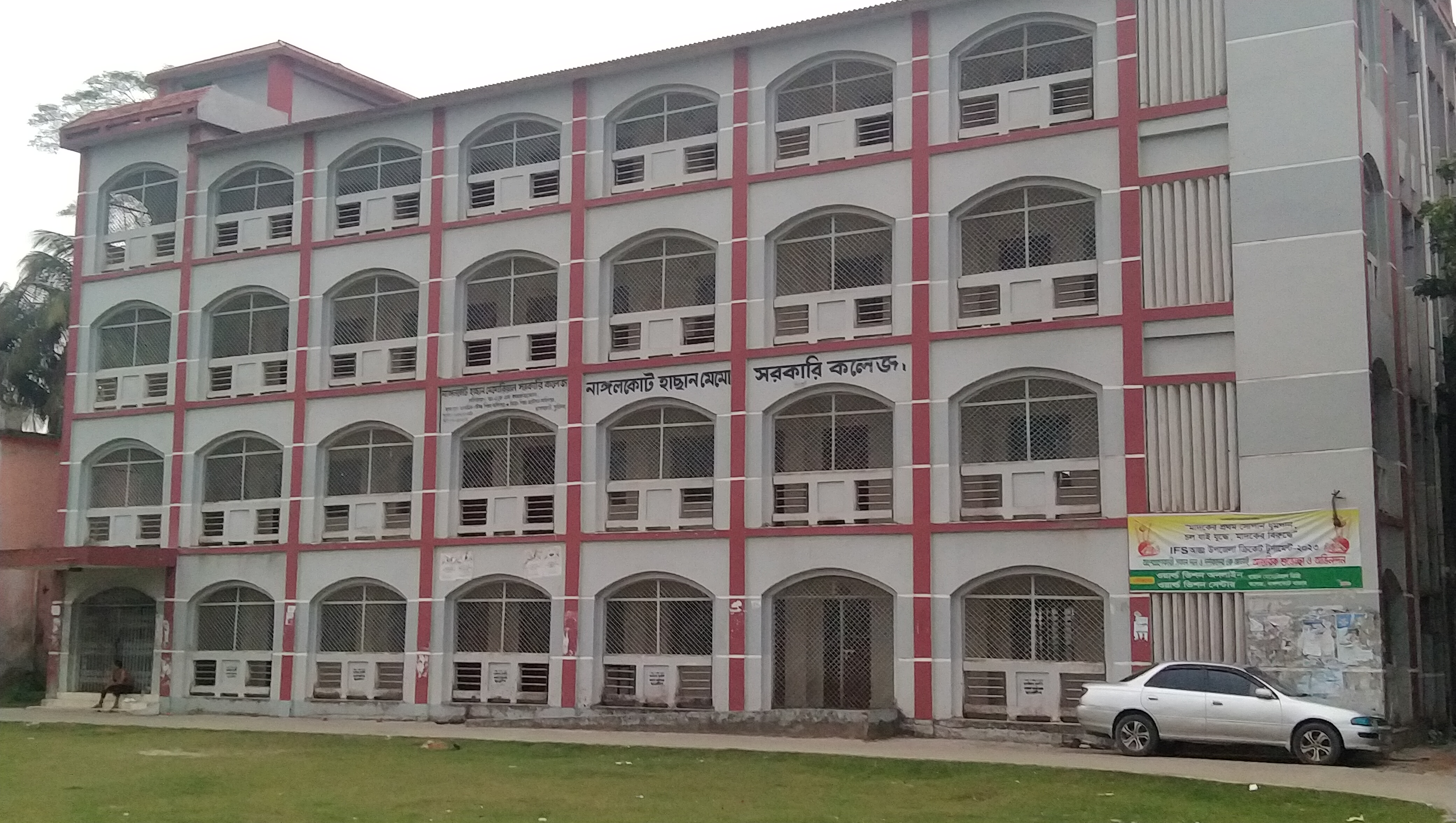
- Nangalkot Hasan Memorial Degree College

- Coordinates: 23°10′N 91°12′E
- Country: Bangladesh
- Division: Chittagong
- District: Comilla

Government
  - MP (Comilla-10): Vacant
  - Upazila Chairman: Vacant

Area
  - Total: 225.95 km^{2} (87.24 sq mi)

Population (2022)
  - Total: 427,895
  - Density: 1,893.8/km^{2} (4,904.8/sq mi)
- Time zone: UTC+6 (BST)
- Postal code: 3580
- Website: nangalkot.comilla.gov.bd

Nangalkot Upazila mauza geocode map

Nangalkot (Bengali: নাঙ্গলকোট) is an upazila, an administrative unit, of the Comilla District in the Division of Chittagong, Bangladesh. It is a rural area with no urban settlements. It has 16 unions, the lowest of administrative units in Bangladesh. It is one of the 16 upazilas, the second tier of administrative units, of the Cumilla District. The language and culture of Nangalkot Upazila is reciprocally similar to the language of the greater Noakhali region.

== History ==
During the Bangladesh Liberation War of 1971, Nangalkot was placed under Sector 2 led by Khaled Mosharraf and then Abu Taher Mohammad Haider. 11 people were killed in Tejer Bazar of the Upazila during the war.

In August 2013, the area experienced violence between Islami Chhatra Shibir activists and the Bangladesh Police. Nangalkot experienced flooding due to heavy rainfall in 2015. Some villages experienced outbreak of diarrhea. The Upazila Nirbahi Officer distributed relief to affected areas. In 2015, a thief was lynched for stealing from Manikmora Bazar Mosque.

== Geography and climate ==
Nangalkot Upazila has an area of 236.44 square kilometres (91.29 sq mi). It is bordered by Laksham and Chauddagram upazila on the West and east, Senbagh and Daganbhuiyan upazilas on the south.

Nangalkot (Town) consists of 3 mouzas. The area of the town is 7.55 km^{2}.

The town has two dak bungalows, One "A" Category Rail Station, One HeliPad and Upazila Headquarters. Most of the Intercity trains (Dhaka-Ctg Road, Chittagong -Sylhet Road, Chittagong-Mymensingh Road) stop at Nangolkot Rail Station.

== Demographics ==
Religions in Nangalkot Upazila (2022)
Religion	Percent
Islam	98.85%
Hinduism	1.14%
Other or not stated	0.01%

According to the 2022 Bangladeshi census, Nangalkot Upazila had 94,562 households and a population of 427,895. 11.46% of the population were under 5 years of age. Nangalkot had a literacy rate (age 7 and over) of 76.47%: 76.81% for males and 76.21% for females, and a sex ratio of 82.86 males for every 100 females. 50,857 (11.89%) lived in urban areas.

According to the 2011 Census of Bangladesh, Nangalkot Upazila had 72,891 households and a population of 373,987. 102,012 (27.28%) were under 10 years of age. Nangalkot had a literacy rate (age 7 and over) of 52.20%, compared to the national average of 51.8%, and a sex ratio of 1181 females per 1000 males. 26,719 (7.14%) lived in urban areas.

== Economy ==
Agriculture is the bedrock of the economy with 45 percent of the population earning their income from it. The most cultivated corps are paddy, wheat, potato, and maize. The next largest segment is the service industry.

== Administration ==
Nangalkot Upazila was established 1983. Upazila Nirbahi Officer is the chief executive in an Upazila. The decision to create the post was made in 1982 by Military dictator Hussain Mohammad Ershad. The government formed a committee, called the committee for administrative reorganization and reform. The committee recommended the formation of upazila parishad under an elected local chairman.

Nangalkot Upazila is divided into Nangalkot Municipality and 13 union parishads: Adra, Bakshaganj, Bangodda, Daulkhar, Dhalua, Heshakhal, Jodda, Makrabpur, Mokara, Peria, Roykot, and Satbaria, Battali. The union parishads are subdivided into 193 mauzas and 270 villages.

Nangalkot Municipality is subdivided into 9 wards and 21 mahallas.

As of 2013, it is one of the seven upazilas of Comilla without a fire station.

== Transport ==
- Paved road 147.00 km; Semi-paved road 8.00 km; 334 km of unpaved roads;
- Number of bridges/culverts: 466;
- The number of rivers is 01;
- There are train facilities. The Dhaka-Chittagong railway line runs through this upazila. There are two train stations in this upazila- Nangalkot station and Hasanpur station.

== Education ==
According to the 2011 census, the literacy rate is 65%; Males constitute 68% of the population and females 62%. The educational institutions of the upazila include 9 regular colleges, 3 technical colleges, 43 high schools (including Mayura' High School founded in 1916 and Daulkhar High School founded in 1929), 34 madrasas, 131 junior and primary schools. All the secondary schools and regular colleges are under the Comilla Board of Intermediate and Secondary Education split from the Chittagong Board in May, 1995.

== Notable people ==
- Abdul Gafur Bhuiyan, MP, is from Gohaura.
- Md. Joynal Abedin Bhuiyan, MP, proposed forming the upazila from unions of Chauddagram and Laksam thanas.
- Muhammad Hasanuzzaman (1900–1968), politician and educationist
- Syed Mahmud Hossain (born 1954), 22nd Chief Justice of Bangladesh
- Kazi Zaker Husain, zoologist, was born in Patoar in 1931.
- AKM Kamruzzaman, physician, doctor and politician
- Omar Ahmed Majumder (1930–1996), politician, lived in Bangodda
- Naem Nizam, journalist, editor, and newspaper owner, is from Goharua.
