= Muhammad Hasanuzzaman =

Bengali politician

Khan Sahib Haji Moulvi Muhammad Hasanuzzaman
- মহম্মদ হাছানুজ্জামান

Member of the Bengal Legislative Assembly
- In office 1937–1945
- Succeeded by: Syed Sirajul Haque
- Constituency: Tippera South

Personal details
- Born: c. 1900 Nangalkot, Tipperah District, Bengal Presidency
- Died: 18 April 1968 (aged 67–68)
- Political party: Krishak Praja Party; Muslim League

Muhammad Hasanuzzaman (Bengali: মহম্মদ হাসানুজ্জামান) was a Bengali educationist and politician. He served as a member of the Bengal Legislative Assembly.

== Early life and family ==
Hasanuzzaman was born in c. 1900 to a Bengali Muslim family in the village of Haripur in Nangalkot, which was then under the Laksam subdivision of the Bengal Presidency's Tipperah (Comilla) District. He was the eldest son of Muhammad Arifur Rahman and Sayyidunnisa Begum. His father was a graduate of the Islamia Madrasa of Chittagong, and became the founding principal of the local Haripur Madrasa from 5 April 1892 until his death in 1923. Hasanuzzaman's mother came from a family of Qadis.

== Education ==
Hasanuzzaman was initially homeschooled by his father, Arifur Rahman, and passed the local primary examinations. He then enrolled at the Chittagong Senior Madrasa, and took first place in the entrance examinations. His talent was noticed by Khan Bahadur Wazuddin, the erstwhile principal of Sirajganj College, under whose influence he joined the Sirajganj College for his Intermediate of Arts. However, as he was the eldest child of the family, he had many responsibilities and left education for employment.

== Career ==
Remaining in the home of Sir Azizul Haque in Sirajganj, Hasanuzzaman found employment as the principal of a junior madrasa. He became influenced to join politics after observing Azizul Haque. He returned to Comilla in 1926, and established the Nangalkot Arafiyyah Junior Madrasa in memory of his father, the following year. In 1927, he was nominated as the director of the Comilla Central Co-operative by the authorities. Among his tasks was opening a bank branch in Laksam in 1929, as the Tippera District only had one, which was situated in Comilla town. Due to non-payment of bank money, deadlock was created and Hasanuzzaman subsequently invited the erstwhile Co-operative Registrar, Khan Bahadur Ershad Ali, to Nangalkot. Ali was asked on behalf of the public to ease the suffering of the indebted people and so he waived the interest of 166,000 taka. He joined the Tippera District Board as a member in 1929. In 1932, he became the president of local Union Board. In every village of the union, he organised a Ulama Committee to maintain adherence to Islamic laws. Two years later, Hasanuzzaman became the secretary of the Laksam Co-operative Bank. He achieved the distinction of building the two-storied picturesque building for the bank with much effort.

He was re-elected to the union board for a second term in 1935. On the new moon of Falgun before the 1935 local election, Satish Chandra Kar Zamindar of Makrabpur was attacked by miscreants on his way to Haripur along with his companion Mansoor Ahmed, Maulvi Abdul Gani and his younger brother Maulvi Ali Ahmed from Tehsil Kachari. Hasanuzzaman came to their defence and was heavily injured. He was held in Comilla Hospital for 32 days, and survived the near-death experience.

Hasanuzzaman contested as a Krishak Praja Party candidate in the 1937 Bengal legislative elections, winning in the Tippera South constituency. The constituency covered the present-day areas of Chauddagram, Laksam, Nangalkot and Hajiganj. The next year, Hasanuzzaman became the first ethnic Bengali member of the Assam-Bengal Railway Board. He was conferred the title of Khan Sahib by the British Raj in 1939. On 17 January 1941, he established the Nangalkot Arifur Rahman High School and got approval and permission to conduct examinations in the same year with the help of A. K. Fazlul Huq. During the Bengal famine of 1943, Hasanuzzaman invited A. M. Martin, the Commissioner of Chittagong Division, to Nangalkot through the co-operative department.

After failing to win a seat at the 1946 Bengal legislative elections, Hasanuzzaman decided to perform Hajj. On his way back, he stopped at Karachi where he briefly served as the vice-chairman of the Pakistan Co-operative Department. He ran as a Muslim League candidate during the 1954 East Bengal Legislative Assembly election but failed to win a seat. During the presidency of Ayub Khan in 1962, Hasanuzzaman was elected to the National Assembly of Pakistan. He was the Parliamentary Secretary (currently equivalent to the Minister of State) in the Ministry of Relief and Rehabilitation during the tenure of Ghulam Farooqui and was appointed as the Whip. In 1963, he was appointed as a member of the Land Reforms Committee. He presented an anti-government speech in Parliament against President Ayub Khan's SUNSET LAW 30th Chaitra Act and said he would not hesitate to give up his seat if necessary. (According to this law, if the rent was not paid by the 30th month, the land would be auctioned). He gave speeches for necessary measures and legislation against cannabis, liquor, gambling and other un-Islamic activities. In parliament, he expressed ideas of the establishment of an Islamic university in East Pakistan. In 1963, 1964 and 1965, for three consecutive years, he strongly emphasized the equitable distribution of Sarshina's annual rights and wealth. In 1963-64 flood affected areas of Barisal and Cox's Bazar, he worked tirelessly to provide relief. In the 1965 elections, he failed to become a Member of Parliament as an independent candidate.

== Death and legacy ==
Since 1965, Hasanuzzaman's body and mind were breaking down due to various reasons. In addition, polyuria and heart disease occurred. On 14 April 1968, he suffered a heart attack while sitting with his son AKM Rafiquzzaman. He was then admitted to Dhaka Medical College Hospital (PG). He died at 7 am on Thursday 18 April 1968. He left behind 4 sons and 4 daughters at the time of his death. His children were Mahmuda Begum, Saleha Begum, Dr. AKM Kamaruzzaman, AKM Shamuzzaman, AKM Rafiquzzaman, Roqeya Begum, AKM Mahbubuzzaman and Umm Kulthum.

His last words were one of the dying. To set up a college in Nangalkot, so that the local poor boys and girls can advance in higher education. Two. Making Nangalkot High School a model school. Three. His youngest son, AKM Mahbub Uz Zaman, successfully completed his engineering studies. Four. Marrying off his youngest daughter, Umm Kulthum.
