= Comilla-12 =

Constituency of Bangladesh's Jatiya Sangsad

- Former constituency for the Jatiya Sangsad
- District: Comilla District
- Division: Chittagong Division

Former constituency
- Created: 1973
- Abolished: 2006

Comilla-12 is a defunct constituency represented in the Jatiya Sangsad (National Parliament) of Bangladesh abolished in 2006.

== Members of Parliament ==
Election	Member	Party
1973	Muhammad Shujat Ali	Awami League
1979	Ali Hossain Mia	BNP
Major Boundary Changes
1986	Kazi Zafar Ahmed	Jatiya Party
February 1996	Shamsuddin Ahmed	BNP
June 1996	Mujibul Haque Mujib	Awami League
2001	Syed Abdullah Muhammad Taher	Jamaat-e-Islami Bangladesh
Abolished constituency
