= Cheora Union =

Union in Comilla District, Bangladesh

Cheora Union Cheora
- Union
- Location within Bangladesh
- Coordinates: 23°9′N 91°19′E
- Upazila: Chauddagram Upazila
- District: Comilla District
- Division: Chittagong Division
- Postal Code: 3583

Cheora Union (Bengali: চিওড়া) is a union parishad of Chauddagram Upazila in Comilla district of Bangladesh.

== Demographics ==
According to the 2011 Bangladesh census, Cheora Union had a population of 32,563. This comprised 15,292 males and 17,271 females. Cheora has an average literacy rate of 62.87%.

== Administrative structure ==
No. 11 Union Parishad is under Chauddagram Upazila of Cheora Union. Administrative activities of this union are under Cheora police station. It is part of Comilla-11, the 259th constituency of the Jatiya Sangsad.Cheora union comprises thirty-nine villages.

== Notable residents ==
- Kazi Zafar Ahmed-Former Prime Minister of Bangladesh
- Musharraf Hussain (nawab)- politician
- Latifur Rahman- Bangladeshi industrialist

== See also ==
- Upazilas of Bangladesh
- Districts of Bangladesh
- Divisions of Bangladesh
