= Mujibul Haque Mujib =

Bangladeshi politician

- মুজিবুল হক মুজিব
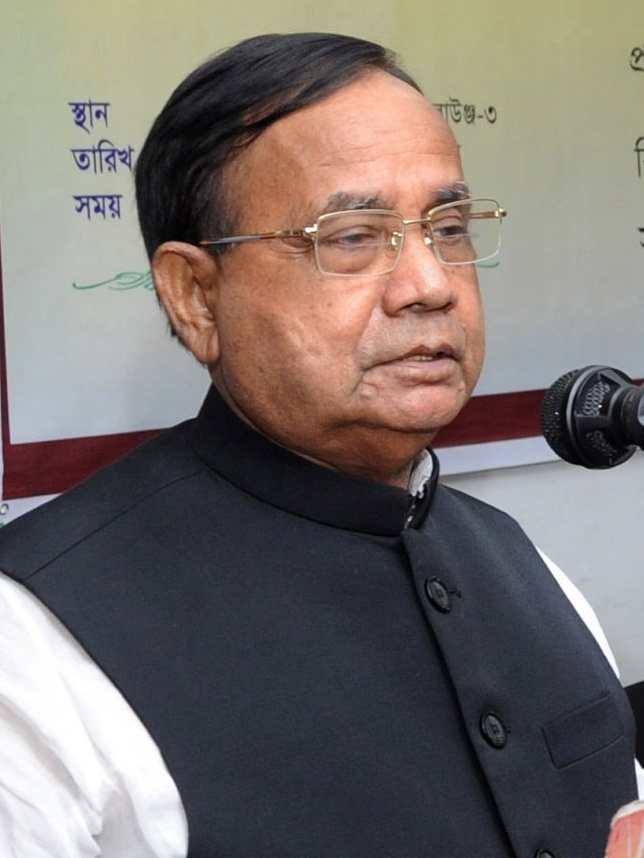
- Mujib in 2018

Minister of Railways
- In office 16 September 2012 – 6 January 2019
- Prime Minister: Sheikh Hasina
- Preceded by: Suranjit Sengupta
- Succeeded by: Nurul Islam Sujon

Member of Parliament
- In office 25 January 2009 – 6 August 2024
- Preceded by: Abdul Gafur Bhuiyan
- Succeeded by: Syed Abdullah Muhammad Taher
- Constituency: Comilla-11
- In office 12 June 1996 – 15 July 2001
- Preceded by: Shamsuddin Ahmed
- Succeeded by: Syed Abdullah Muhammad Taher
- Constituency: Comilla-12

Personal details
- Born: 31 May 1947 (age 79) Basuara, Tipperah district, Bengal Province, British India
- Party: Bangladesh Awami League
- Education: Comilla Victoria Government College

Mujibul Haque Mujib (born 31 May 1947) is a Bangladeshi politician and a former Jatiya Sangsad member representing Comilla-11 constituency during 2009–2024. He served as the Minister of Railways during 2012–2018.

== Early life ==
Mujib was born on 31 May 1947 in Basuara village in Tipperah district, British India (now in Sreepur Union under Chauddagram Upazila of Comilla District, Bangladesh). He completed his B.Com. degree from Comilla Victoria College.

== Personal life ==
In October 2014, at the age of 67, Mujib married Honufa Akhter Rikta who was 38 years his junior. In May 2016, the couple had a daughter They had twin sons in May 2018.
