= Gunabati railway station =

Railway station in Comilla District, Bangladesh

Gunabati গুণবতী
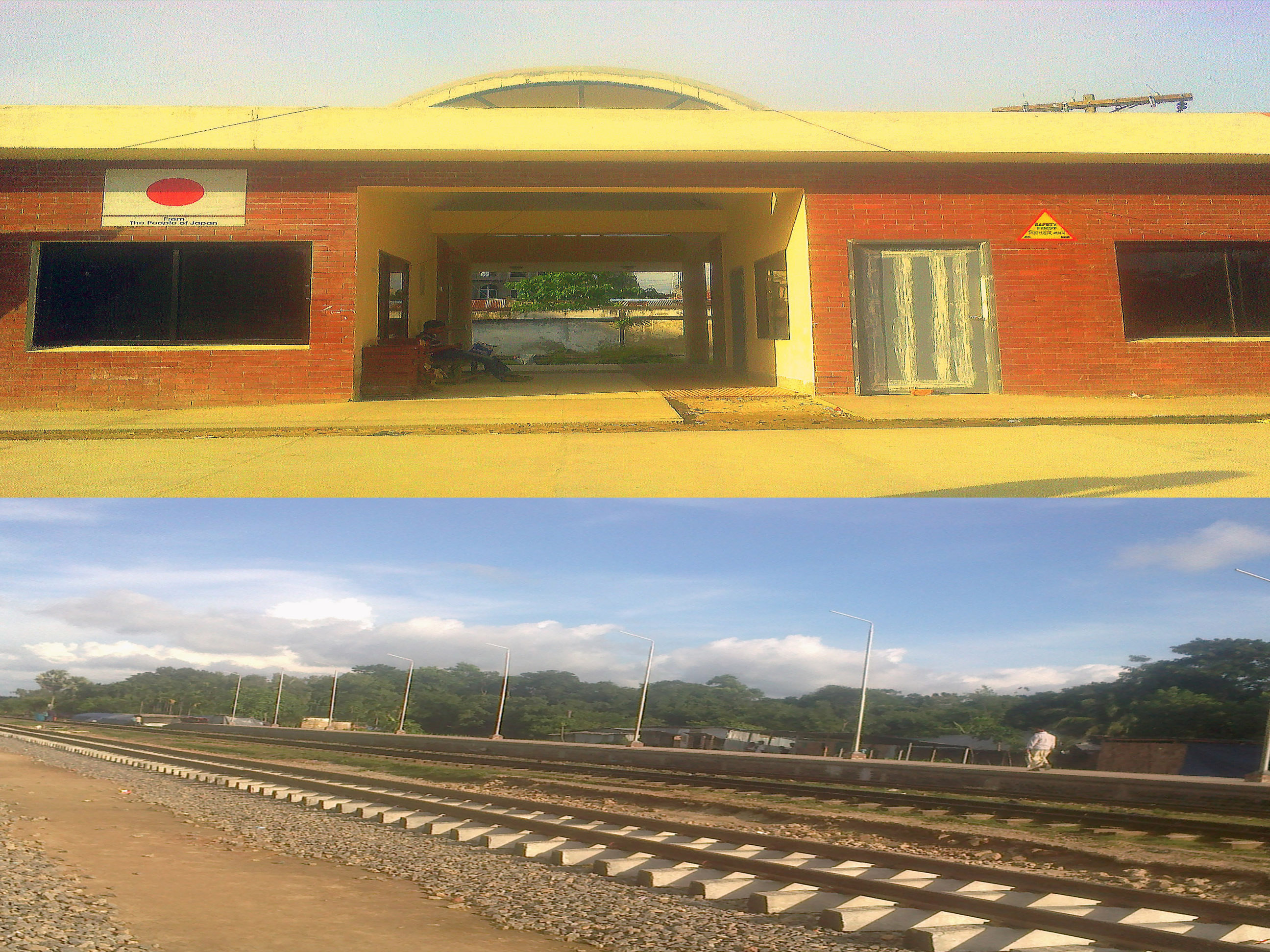
- Gunabati Railway Station

General information
- Location: Gunabati, Chauddagram, Cumilla; Bangladesh
- Coordinates: 23°05′15″N 91°17′51″E
- System: Bangladesh Railway Station
- Line: 4 (Up 2, Down 2)
- Platforms: 2
Location

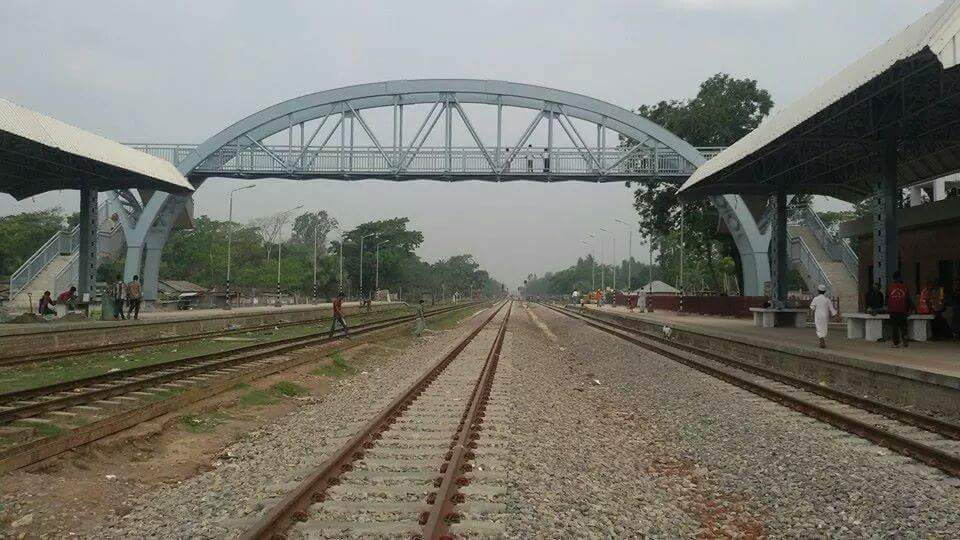
Gunabati Railway Station Foot Over Bridge

Gunabati Railway Station (Bengali: গুণবতী রেলস্টেশন) is located in the heart of Gunabati Bazar. The station is the main station of Gunabati Union and is linked to Dhaka by the Gunabati – Cumilla rail line, to Chattagram by the Gunabati – Feni line.
