= Baiara =

Baiara বাইয়ারা
- Village
- Location in Bangladesh
- Coordinates: 23°6.9′N 91°10.8′E
- Country: Bangladesh
- Division: Chittagong Division
- District: Comilla District
- Upazila: Nangalkot Upazila

Government
  - MP (AL): AHM MD Mostofa Kamal
  - Chairman: Anwar Hossain miaji
- Time zone: UTC+6 (BST)
- Website: Official Map of Baiara

Baiara (Bengali: বাইয়ারা) is a village of Judda Union, Nangalkot Upazila of the Comilla District in the Division of Chittagong, Bangladesh.

== Geography ==
Baiara is 7 kilometres (4.3 mi) south-south-west of Nangalkot rail station and 7 kilometres (4.3 mi) east of regional highway R141 at Natherpetua. The nearest villages are Noapara to the north, Hasanpur to the east, Duriara-Narayankot to the south-east, Vobanipur to the south, Bahura to the south-west, and Korpati-Duaria to the west.

== Demographics ==
According to the 2011 Bangladesh census, Baiara had 726 households and a population of 3,853.

== Economy ==
About 44% of those employed are engaged in agriculture, and about 54% are in the service sector.

There are 100 shops in Baiara Bazaar; it is one of the biggest bazaars of Nangalkot Upazila. Friday and Tuesday are market days. There selling and purchasing are contracted from noon to midnight. More people from other villages also come to Baiara to buy and sell their goods in this bazaar.

== Administration ==
Baiara is part of parliamentary constituency Comilla-10.
MP- A H M Mostofa Kamal(AL)[2009-2014, 2014-]

The first member of Bangladesh Parliament of Baiara is; Omar Ahmed Mojumdar(NP)
The Chairman of Judda Union is; Md. Ali Akkas.

== Education ==
There is one secondary school in the village, Baiara Zainal High School. There is one primary school in the village, Baiara Government Primary School.
