= Abdul Gafur Bhuiyan =

Bangladeshi politician

- আব্দুল গফুর ভূইয়া

Member of the Bangladesh Parliament for Comilla-11
- In office October 2001 – October 2006
- Preceded by: Md. Joynal Abedin Bhuiyan
- Succeeded by: Mujibul Haque Mujib

Personal details
- Political party: Bangladesh Nationalist Party

Abdul Gafur Bhuiyan is a Bangladesh Nationalist Party politician and a former Jatiya Sangsad member representing the Comilla-11 constituency during 2001–2006.

== Career ==
Bhuiyan was elected to Parliament in 2001 from Comilla-11 as a candidate of Bangladesh Nationalist Party.

On 1 November 2006, his activists fought against his political rivals and burned down the home of Kamruzzaman, his rival. A local leader of Islami Chhatra Shibir, Mohammad Shahjahan, was killed in the fighting. Maulana SM Mohiuddin, the Ameer of Nangalkot Upazila, filed a murder case over Shahjahan's death against 51 including Bhuiyan. On 22 May 2007, he was detained on corruption charges. On 4 March 2007, he was sent to jail by a court. He was facing a number of charges including one for murder. On 16 December 2018, he was arrested from Bangladesh High Court area in Dhaka by Detective Branch of Bangladesh Police.

On 21 December 2008, Bangladesh Election Commission cancelled Bhuiyan candidacy after he filed with the commission twice, one as an independent candidate and again as a Bangladesh Nationalist Party candidate. The Election Commission had given the paddy leaf, symbol of Bangladesh Nationalist Party, to Mobasher Alam Bhuiyan, an independent candidate. It then took the allocated symbol of Alamgir Hossan but withdrew its decision following a court verdict that asked the election commission to allocate the symbol to Mobasher.
