= Shamsuddin Ahmed (Comilla politician) =

Bangladeshi politician

- সামছু উদ্দিন আহমেদ

Member of Parliament for Comilla-12
- In office 15 February 1996 – 12 June 1996
- Preceded by: Kazi Zafar Ahmed
- Succeeded by: Mujibul Haque Mujib

Personal details
- Born: Comilla
- Party: Bangladesh Nationalist Party

Shamsuddin Ahmed is a politician from Comilla District of Bangladesh. He was elected a member of parliament from Comilla-12 in February 1996.

== Career ==
Shamsuddin Ahmed was elected a member of parliament from the Comilla-12 constituency as a Bangladesh Nationalist Party candidate in the sixth parliamentary election on 15 February 1996.
