= Md. Joynal Abedin Bhuiyan =

Bangladeshi politician

Member of Bangladesh Parliament
- In office 1979–1985
- Preceded by: Kazi Zahirul Qayyum
- Succeeded by: constituency abolished
- In office 1996–2001
- Preceded by: AKM Kamruzzaman
- Succeeded by: Abdul Gafur Bhuiyan

Personal details
- Died: 27 January 2005
- Party: Awami League

Md. Joynal Abedin Bhuiyan was an Awami League politician and a former member of parliament for Comilla-11.

== Career ==
Bhuiyan was elected to parliament from Comilla-16 as an Awami League candidate in 1979.

Bhuiyan was elected to parliament from Comilla-11 as an Awami League candidate in 1996.

== Death ==
Bhuiyan died on 27 January 2005.
