= Kazi Musharraf Hussain =

Bengali politician (1871–1966)

Khan Bahadur Nawab Kazi Musharraf Hussain

Minister of Education

Member of the Bengal Legislative Assembly
- In office 1937–1947
- Constituency: Jalpaiguri - Darjeeling

Personal details
- Born: 1871 Cheora, Bengal Presidency, British India
- Died: November 15, 1966 (aged 94–95) West Bengal, India
- Party: All-India Muslim League
- Education: Hooghly Mohsin College
- Alma mater: University of Calcutta (BL)

Kazi Musharraf Hussain (1871 – 15 November 1966) was an Indian politician. He was a minister in the Bengal Legislative Assembly and was later a member of the West Bengal Legislative Assembly.

== Early life ==
Kazi Musharraf Hussain was born in 1871 to an aristocratic Bengali family of Muslim Kazis in Cheora, Chauddagram, then part of the Tipperah district of the Bengal Presidency. His family was a Zamindar family in the region. His father was Kazi Mukarram Ali, who was lawyer at Comilla Judge Court. He graduated from Hooghly Mohsin College in 1899. He completed his law degree from the University of Calcutta. After graduation he married Faizunnesa Begum. His wife was the daughter of a tea planter through who he inherited tea estates in Jalpaiguri.

== Career ==
Musharraf started his legal career in the Jalpaiguri district bar. In 1918 he was elected to the Bengal Legislative council, he campaigned on issues that affected Muslims of Bengal. He also served in the Bengal Legislative Council from 1923 to 1936. In 1926 he was given the title Khan Bahadur and Nawab by the British Raj. In 1927 he was the Minister of Education for Bengal. He helped in the passage of Compulsory Free Primary Education Bill . He served as the vice president of the Bengal United Muslim Party.

Musharraf was elected to the Bengal Legislative Assembly in the 1937 Bengal Legislative Assembly election as an independent candidate from the Jalpaiguri-cum-Darjeeling constituency. He joined the Muslim League after the elections. From 1937 to 1941 he was the minister of Law and Judicial ministry. From 1943 to 1945 he was in charge of another ministry. Hussain was re-elected from the same constituency at the 1946 Bengal Legislative Assembly election. He was initially an advocate of the Pakistan Movement but he remained in India after the Partition. He went on to serve in the West Bengal state assembly.

== Death ==
Musharraf died on 15 November 1966.
