= Roykot Union =

Raykot
- Union
- Location in Bangladesh
- Country: Comilla Bangladesh
- Division: Chittagong Division
- District: Comilla District
- Upazilas: Nangalkot Upazila

Area
  - Total: 23.2 km^{2} (9.0 sq mi)

Population (2001)
  - Total: 34,393
- Time zone: UTC+6 (BST)
- Website: raykotup.comilla.gov.bd

Raykot is a union parishad, the smallest administrative body of Bangladesh, located in Nangalkot Upazila, Comilla District, Bangladesh. The total population is 34,393.
