= Peria Union =

Peria
- Union
- Location in Bangladesh
- Country: Comilla Bangladesh
- Division: Chittagong Division
- District: Comilla District
- Upazilas: Nangalkot Upazila

Area
  - Total: 14.5 km^{2} (5.6 sq mi)

Population (2001)
  - Total: 23,318
- Time zone: UTC+6 (BST)
- Website: Official Map of Nangalkot

Peria is a union parishad, the smallest administrative body of Bangladesh, located in Nangalkot Upazila, Comilla District, Bangladesh. The total population is 23,318.
