= Syed Abdullah Mohammed Taher =

Politician of Bangladesh Jamaat-e-Islami

- সৈয়দ আবদুল্লাহ মোহাম্মদ তাহের
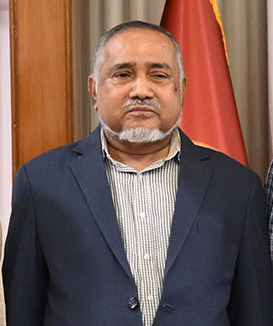
- Taher in 2025

8th Deputy Leader of the Opposition
- Incumbent
- Assumed office 17 February 2026
- Prime Minister: Tarique Rahman
- Leader: Shafiqur Rahman
- Preceded by: Anisul Islam Mahmud

Member of Parliament
- Incumbent
- Assumed office 17 February 2026
- Preceded by: Mujibul Haque Mujib
- Constituency: Comilla-11
- In office 10 October 2001 – 29 October 2006
- Preceded by: Mujibul Haque Mujib
- Succeeded by: Mujibul Haque Mujib
- Constituency: Comilla-12

General Secretary of International Islamic Federation of Student Organizations
- In office 1992–1998
- Preceded by: Mustafa Osman Ismail
- Succeeded by: Ömer Faruk Korkmaz

President of Bangladesh Islami Chhatra Shibir
- In office 1986–1987
- Preceded by: Muhammad Tasneem Alam
- Succeeded by: Shamsul Islam

Personal details
- Born: 1 January 1956 (age 70)
- Party: Bangladesh Jamaat-e-Islami
- Spouse: Habiba Akhter Chowdhury
- Education: Dhaka Medical College
- Occupation: Politician

Syed Abdullah Mohammed Taher (Bengali: সৈয়দ আবদুল্লাহ মোহাম্মদ তাহের; born 1958) is a Bangladeshi physician, politician, Islamic scholar, and social worker. He is the Nayeb-e-Ameer (vice president) of Bangladesh Jamaat-e-Islami and a member of its Central Working Committee.

He previously served as a member of parliament from the Comilla-12 constituency during the seventh parliamentary elections from 2001 to 2006. Following constituency re-delimitation, Comilla-12 is now known as Comilla-11.

According to user-provided information, he again became a member of parliament from the Comilla-11 constituency on 13 February 2026, succeeding Mujibul Haque Mujib.

He was elected general secretary of the Dhaka Medical College Student Union (DMCSU).

== Career ==
Taher was nominated as secretary general of the Islami Chatra Shibir and finally led the organisation as its central president for two consecutive terms during 1985-86 and 1986–87.

Taher was elected as a member of parliament in Bangladesh from 2001 to 2006 and was part of two parliamentary bodies, the public accounts committee and the public undertaking committee.

Taher was also arrested by joint forces on allegations of extortion, looting and grabbing during the tenure of the military backed caretaker government on 7 March 2007. Later he was released.

Taher was imprisoned several times, He was arrested on 2 January 2013, by RAB personnel, in connection with various allegations, including arson attacks, attacks on police and conspiracy against the government. He was later released on bail. His most recent imprisonment was on 25 July 2024 in July uprising and later he was released on 5 August 2024 after coup.

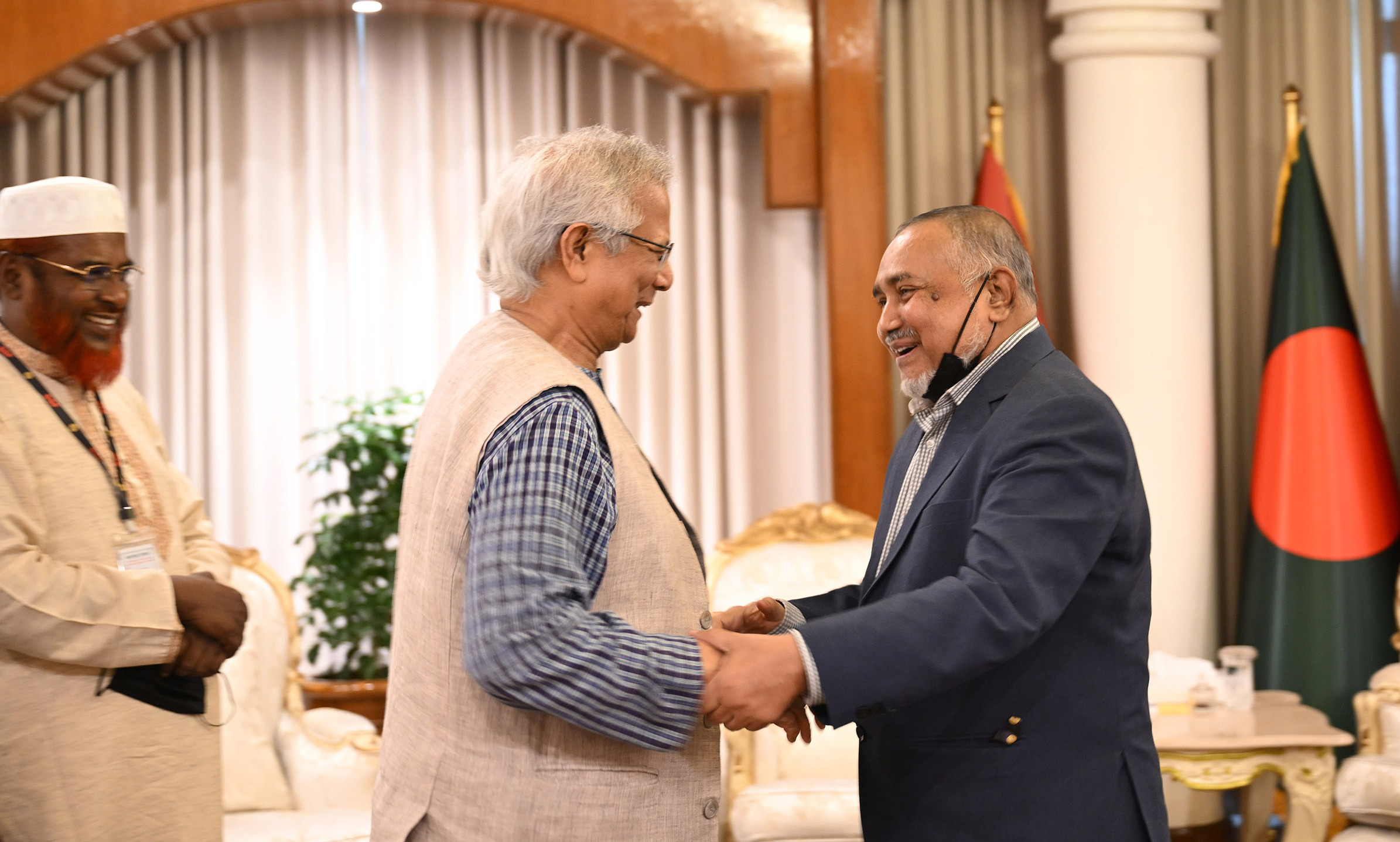
Syed Abdullah Mohammad Taher is seen exchanging greetings with Muhammad Yunus.

Taher met with the first political secretary at the United States Embassy, Matthew Bay, on 16 October 2023.
