= List of honorary fellows of the Queen's College, Oxford =

This is a list of Honorary Fellows of The Queen's College, Oxford.

- Tony Abbott
- Rowan Atkinson
- Sir James Ball
- Sir Michael Barber
- Sir Richard Barrons
- Adrian Beecroft
- Sir Tim Berners-Lee
- Sir Christopher Bland
- Sir Vernon Bogdanor
- Cory Booker
- Alan Bowman
- Sir Alan Budd
- Richard Carwardine
- Clayton Christensen
- Sir James Craig
- Sir Brian Donnelly
- David Eisenberg
- Bill Frankland
- Elizabeth Frood
- Eric Garcetti
- Sir John Gillen
- Annette Gordon-Reed
- Sir John Griffith Williams
- Peter Hacker
- Ilkka Hanski
- Allen Hill
- Leonard Hoffmann, Baron Hoffmann
- Tony Honoré
- Ioan James
- David Jenkins
- Ruth Kelly
- Asma Khan
- Ron Laskey
- Sir Paul Lever
- Colin Low, Baron Low of Dalston
- Paul Madden
- Avishai Margalit
- Sir Colin McColl
- Sir Fergus Millar
- The Lord Morgan of Aberdyfi
- Dennis Nineham
- Caryl Phillips
- Venki Ramakrishnan
- Jim Reed
- Oliver Sacks
- Hayaatun Sillem
- John Sloboda
- Sir David Smith
- Nicholas Stern, Baron Stern of Brentford
- Claire Taylor
- Sir Mark Turner
- James Watt
- Clair Wills
