= Bangodda Union =

Bangodda
- Union
- Location in Bangladesh
- Country: Comilla Bangladesh
- Division: Chittagong Division
- District: Comilla District
- Upazilas: Nangalkot Upazila

Area
  - Total: 12.5 km^{2} (4.8 sq mi)

Population (2001)
  - Total: 20,013
- Time zone: UTC+6 (BST)
- Website: Official Map of Nangalkot

Bangodda Union is a union parishad, the smallest administrative body of Bangladesh, located in Nangalkot Upazila, Comilla District, Bangladesh. The total population is 20,013.
