= Gunabati College =

Educational institution of Bangladesh

- গুণবতী কলেজ
- Other name: GDC
- Type: National university
- Established: 1968
- Founder: Sayed Lutfor Rahman
- Academic affiliations: National University of Bangladesh
- Chancellor: President of Bangladesh Abdul Hamid
- Vice-Chancellor: Harun-or-Rashid
- Principal: Mohiuddin Muhammad Faruk
- Location: Comilla, Bangladesh; 23.0903°N 91.2998°E
- Campus: Suburban
- Language: Bangla
- Education Board: Comilla Education Board

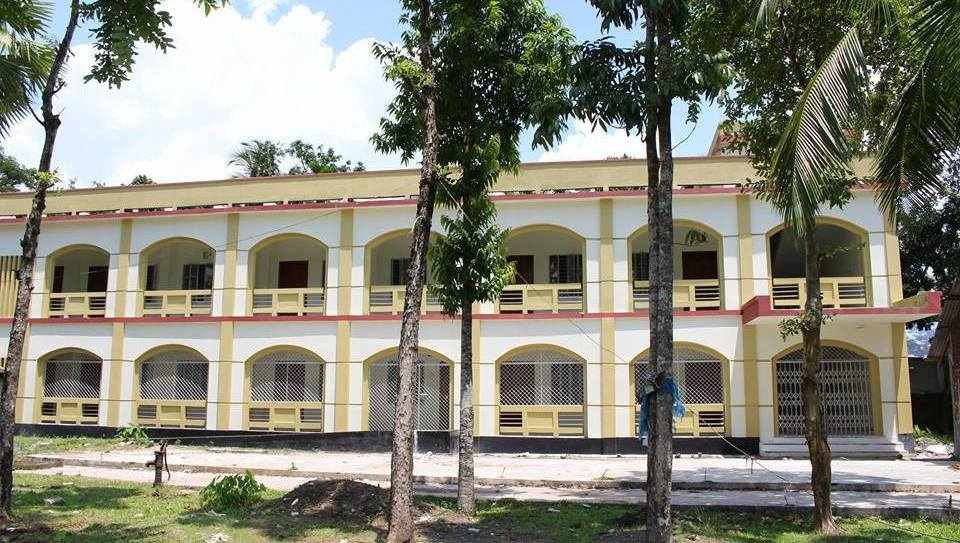
Gunabati College

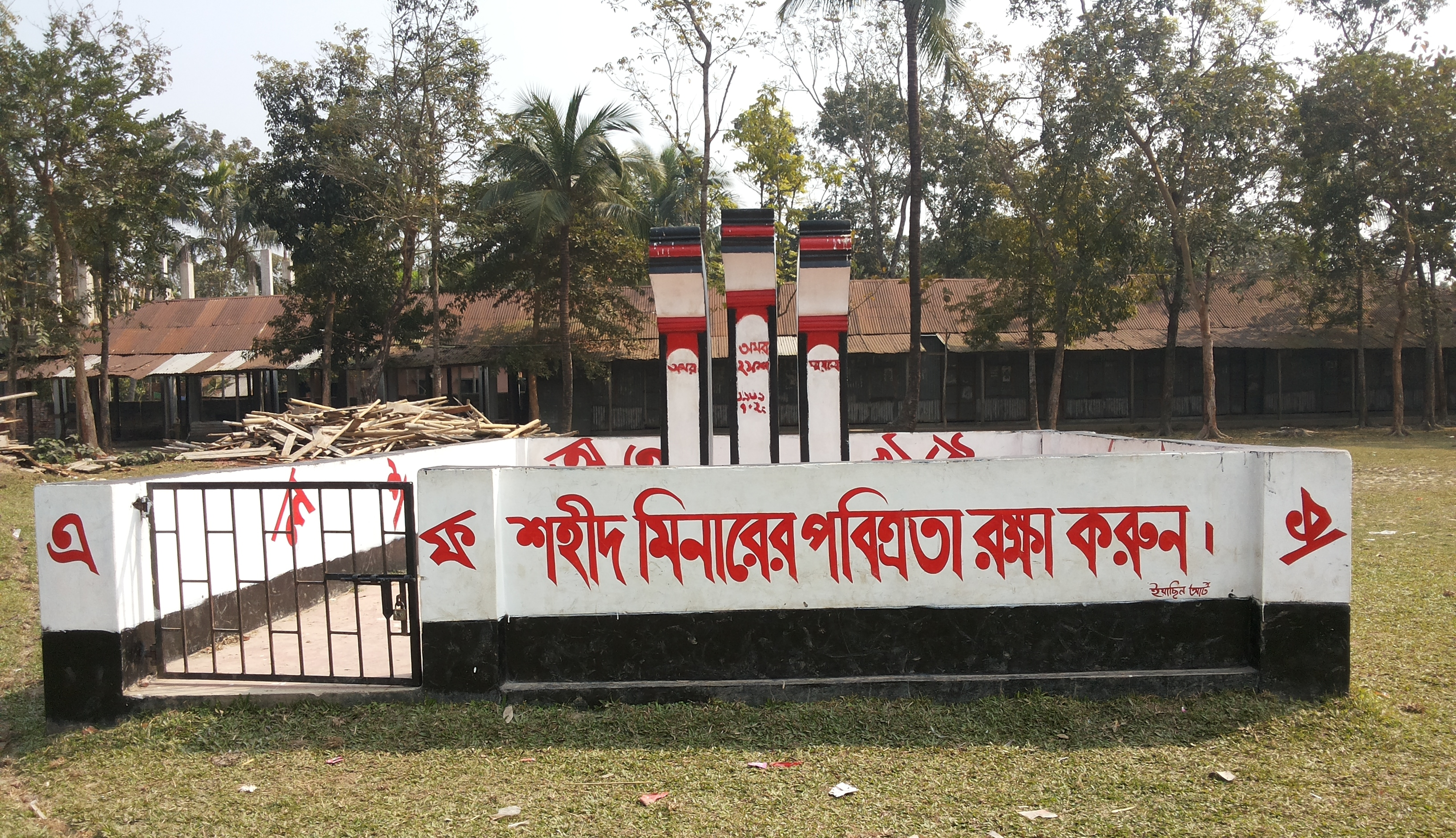
Shaheed Minar of Gunabati College

Gunabati College (Bengali: গুণবতী ডিগ্রী কলেজ) is a Bangladeshi national university located in Gunabati Bazar. It offers higher-secondary education (HSC). It has a degree pass course program which is affiliated with the National University of Bangladesh. Its EIIN code is 105509.

== History ==
Gunabati College was founded as an intermediate college. The first day of instruction was 1 July 1968. It was founded by principal Sayed Lutfor Rahman.

== Education program ==
The educational activities of the intermediate section are affiliated with the Comilla Education Board and the degree pass course is affiliated with the National University of Bangladesh.

=== Higher secondary education ===
Science, humanities and commerce of HSC or Higher Secondary Education section are taught.

== Co-education programs ==
- Scouting
- Sports (athletics, cricket and football)
- Debating
- Cultural events
- Learning tour etc.

== Uniform ==
The uniform of Gunabati College is an azure-colored shirt and black pants. Both long-sleeve or short-sleeve shirts are acceptable. Shirts must have the right-sleeve monogram badge.

== Infrastructure ==
Though Gunabati College was established in 1968, its infrastructure is undeveloped, including having a shortage of classrooms.

== See also ==
- List of educational institutions in Comilla
