= Daulkhar Union =

Daulkhar
- Union
- Location in Bangladesh
- Country: Comilla Bangladesh
- Division: Chittagong Division
- District: Comilla District
- Upazilas: Nangalkot Upazila

Area
  - Total: 28.8 km^{2} (11.1 sq mi)

Population (2001)
  - Total: 35,761
- Time zone: UTC+6 (BST)
- Website: Official Map of Nangalkot

Daulkhar is a union parishad, the smallest administrative body of Bangladesh, located in Nangalkot Upazila, Comilla District, Bangladesh. The total population is 35,761.
