= Ali Hossain Mia =

Bangladeshi politician

- আলী হোসেন মিঞা

Member of Parliament for Comilla-12
- In office 18 February 1979 – 12 February 1982
- Preceded by: Muhammad Shujat Ali
- Succeeded by: Seats abolished

Personal details
- Born: 1936 or 1937 (age 88–89) Comilla District
- Party: Bangladesh Nationalist Party

Ali Hossain Mia (born 1936 or 1937) is a politician from Comilla District of Bangladesh. He was elected a member of parliament for Comilla-12 in the 1979 Bangladeshi general election.

== Career ==
Ali Hossain Mia was elected a member of parliament for constituency Comilla-12 as a Bangladesh Nationalist Party candidate in the 1979 Bangladeshi general election.
