= Gunabati Union =

- 12 No. Gunabati Union Parishod
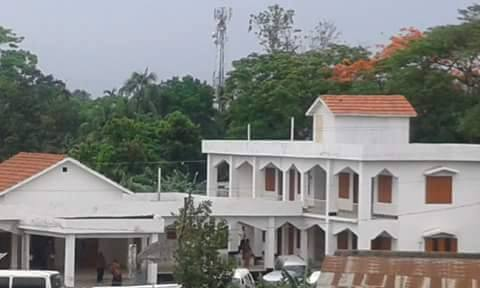
- Gunabati Union Parishod Building

- Location within Bangladesh
- Coordinates: 23°5.5′N 91°18.5′E
- Country: Bangladesh
- Division: Chittagong
- District: Cumilla
- Upazila: Chauddagram
- Time zone: UTC+6 (BST)
- Website: goonabatiup.comilla.gov.bd

Gunabati Union (Bengali: গুণবতী) is a union, situated at Chauddagram, Cumilla. It lies along the bank of the Dakatiya River. It covered an area of 20.40 km^{2}, and had a population of 36,789.

== History ==
Gunabati is named after the name of "Gunbati", wife of Maharaja Govinda Manik of Tripura.

== Language and culture ==
=== Language ===
Due to the geographical position, Gunabati is situated in the south-eastern region of Bangladesh. It is bounded by Tripura State of India, the upazilas of Dhaka Division And Chittagong Division. The language of the people of Gunabati Union is mostly influenced by Tripura State of India, the upazilas of Dhaka Division And Chittagong Division. The main features of the language are similar to the other upazilas of Bangladesh. Yet some diversity is found. In the spoken language, the sound of "mahapran dhonni" is absent. This means that there is a trend of simplification of language. The language of Gunabati Union is very similar to the language of Dhaka region, regional languages of Laksham Upazila and the language of Noakhali.

=== Culture ===
The culture of Gunabati union is the holder and carrier of the ancient Bangladesh. The Bangla New Year is still celebrated there. Boishakhi fair is organized in different places on the occasion of Bangla New Year. Apart from this, the Nabanna festival, welcome to monsoon, and various social and domestic festivals in winter are celebrated by the people of Gunabati union. The ancient games of Bengal Ha-Doo-Doo, Gollachut, Kanamachi Bhoo-Bhoo are still played by many of the villagers.

== Administration ==
| Size | 20.40 km^{2} |
| Population | 36789 |
| Postal Code | 3583 |
| No. of Village | 29 |
| Post Office | 1 |
| Bank | 11 |
| Hospital | 2 |
| NGO | 21 |
| River | 2 |
| Market | 29 |
| % of Education | 65% |

=== Structure ===
Gunabati Union is a union parishad of Chauddagram upazilla. Administrative activities of this union are under Chauddagram police station. It is a part of Comilla-11 constituency No. 259 of the Jatiya Sangsad. It is divided into 32 mouzas. The union has 9 wards and 28 villages. The villages of this union are:

Ward 1

Rampur, Bishnupur, Shubornopur, Gajariya

Ward 2

Surikara, Jhikodda, Akhirtola, Moyurpur

Ward 3

Porikot, Fuler Nawri, Boro Khaiyajola

Ward 4

Godanogor, Rajbollobpur

Ward 5

Chapachow, Kortam, Gunabati Bazar

Ward 6

Dashbaha, Narayanpur, North Pirijkora

Ward 7

South Sripur, South Pirijkora, Akdiya

Ward 8

Chapaliya Para, Budhora, Koitora

Ward 9

Gunabati, Khatora, Bagertham

== Education ==
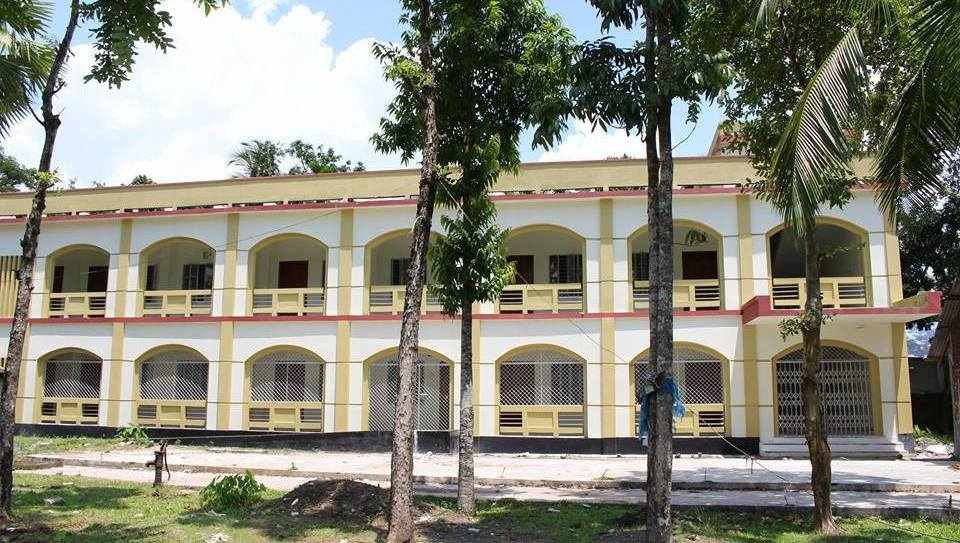
Gunabati Degree College

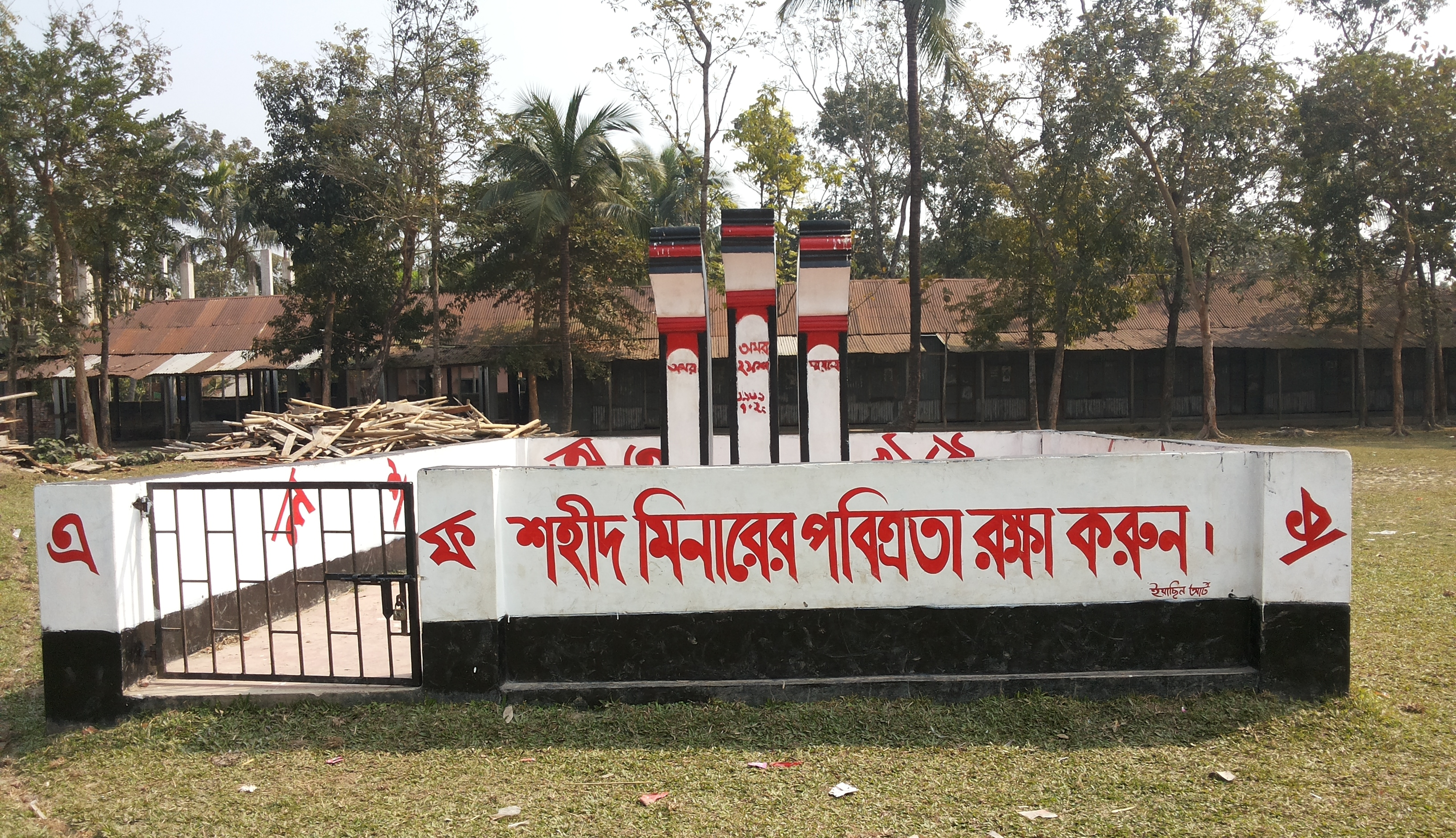
Shaheed Minar of Gunabati College

=== College ===
- Gunabati Degree College

=== High schools ===
- Gunabati M/L High School
- Gunabati Al Farabi High School
- Gunabati Girls' High School
- Surikara Junior High School
- Budhora High School

=== Primary schools ===
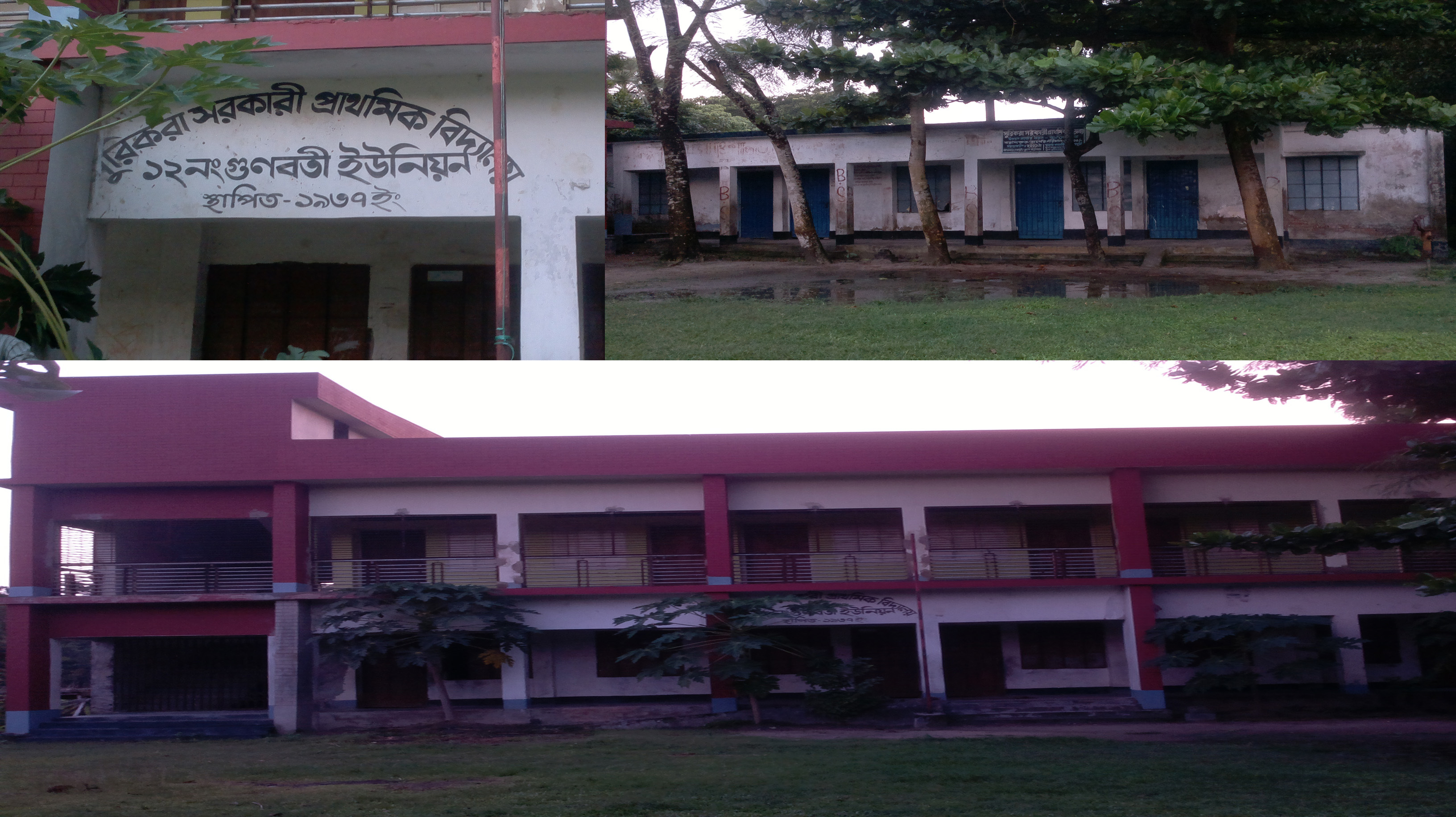
Surikara Primary School

- Surikara Govt Primary School
- Surikara Holy Flower Academy
- Budhora Govt Primary School
- Akdia Govt Primary School
- Rajballabfur Govt Praimary School
- Gunabati Govt Primary School
- Porikot Govt Primary School
- Chapalia Pada Primary School
- Gunabati Pre Cadet Institute
- Adrasha Pre Cadet Institute
- South Sreepur Govt. Primary School
- Dosh Baha Govt.Primary School

=== Madrasa ===
- Gunabati Fazil Madrasha
- Surikara Risalatul Quran Madrasha
- Khatora Sultania Karimia Kawmia Madrasha
- Rajballabfur Jabbaria Balika Dakhil Madrasa
- Rjballabfur Hajipada Nurani Madrasha
- Akdia Hafizia Madrasha
- South Sreepur Dakhil Boys' Madrasa
- South Sreepur Dakhil Girls' Madrasa
- Dosh Baha Islahe Ummat Madrasa
- Jamea Faruqia Madrasa Gunabati

== Economics ==
=== List of Banks ===
1. Janata Bank
2. Islami Bank Bangladesh Ltd [Agent Banking]
3. Dhaka Bank Limited
4. Southeast Bank Limited
5. Pubali Bank
6. Shahjalal Islami Bank Limited
7. NRB Global Bank
8. Dutch Bangla Bank [Agent Banking]
9. NRBC Bank
10. IFIC Bank [Uposhakha]
11. Social Islami Bank [Agent Banking]

=== NGOs ===
- Brac
- Khan Foundation
- TMMS
- ASHA
- Grameen Bank

== Transport ==
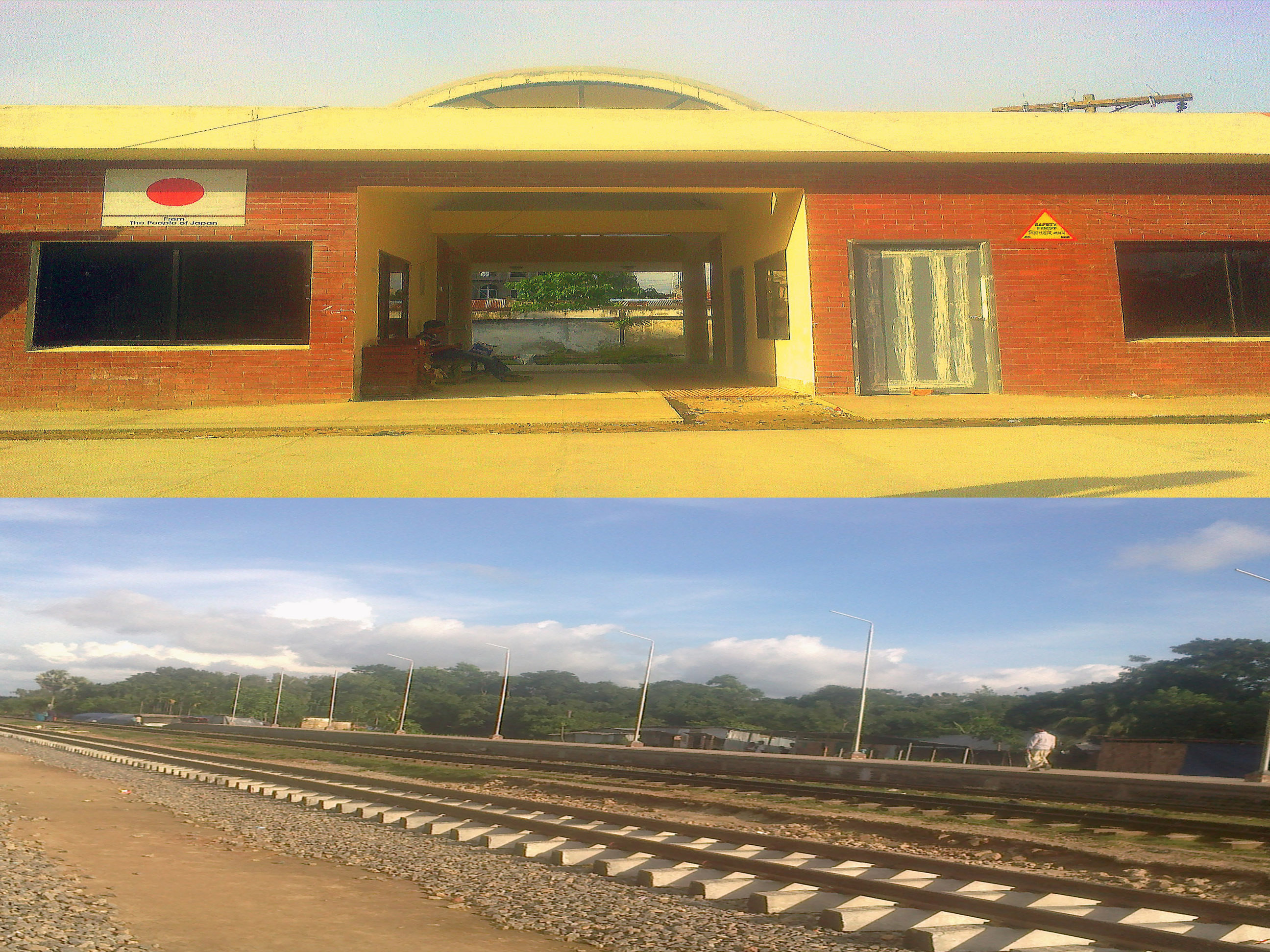
Gunabati Railway Station

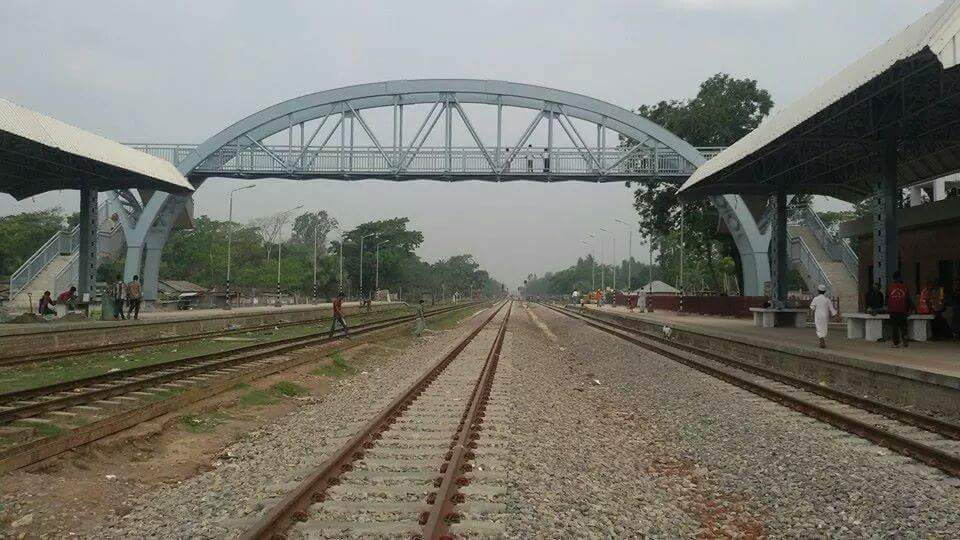
Gunabati Railway Station Foot Over Bridge

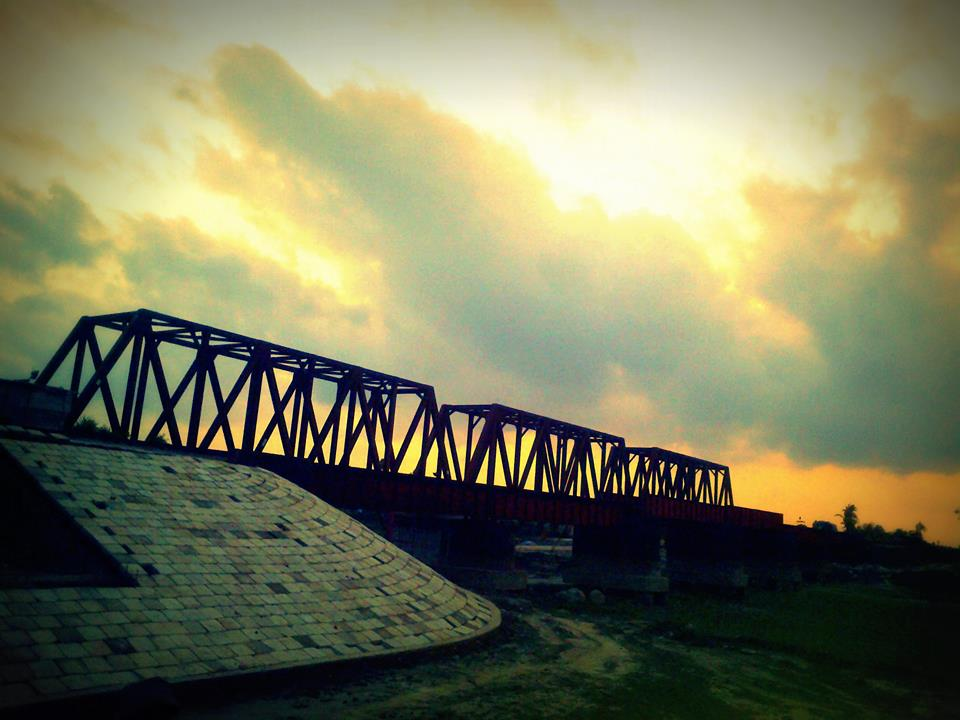
Porikot Railway Bridge

There is a railway station (name: Gunabati Railway Station), a CNG station and a seasonal boat terminal.

=== Railway services ===
Intercity services

- Mohanagar Godhuli @4:47 PM toward Dhaka
- Mohanagar Provati @12:09 PM toward Chittagong

Local services

- Demu
- Jalalabad
- Karnafuli
- Nasirabad
- Sagorika

| Road | Bus | Station/Stand | Rent | | |
| Gunabati to Dhaka | Mohanagar Godhuli | Gunabati Railway Station | 250 tk. | | |
| Gunabati to Chattogram | Mohanagar Provati | Gunabati Railway Station | 125 tk. | | |
| Gunabati to Feni | Mohanagar Provati | Gunabati Railway Station | 50 tk | | |
| Dhaka to Gunabati | Star Line (Dhaka to Padua Bazar) | Titipara, Sayedabad | 380 tk. | | |
| Dhaka to Gunabati | Dream Line (Dhaka to Padua Bazar) | Titipara, Sayedabad | 380 tk. | | |
| Dhaka to Gunabati | Ena Transport (Dhaka to Padua Bazar) | Titipara, Sayedabad | 360 ta. | | |
| Dhaka to Gunabati | Seba Transport (Dhaka to Padua Bazar) | Sayedabad | 360 tk. | | |
| Chittagong to Gunabati | Soudia | | 240 tk. | | |
| | Tisha | | 240 tk. | | |
| Comilla to Gunabati | Jamuna (Comilla to Padua Bazar) | Jangalia | 70 tk. | | |
| | Madina (Comilla to Padua Bazar) | Chwak Bazar | 70 tk. | | |
| Feni to Gunabati | Jamuna (Feni to Padua Bazar) | Mohipal | 20 tk. | | |
| | Madina (Feni to Padua Bazar) | Trank Road | 20 tk. | | |
| Podua Bazar to Gunabati | CNG | Podua Bazar Highway | 20 tk. | CNG Fuler nawri to gunabati | 20 tk. |

== Healthcare ==
=== Hospitals ===
- Gunabati Diagnostics Hospital
- Oli Ahmed Diagnostic Center

=== Clinics ===
- Gunabati Health Clinic
