= Nangalkot Municipality =

Nangalkot নাঙ্গলকোট
- Municipality
- Location in Bangladesh
- Coordinates: 23°10′N 91°12′E
- Country: Comilla Bangladesh
- Division: Chittagong Division
- District: Comilla District
- Upazilas: Nangalkot Upazila

Area
  - Total: 29.8 km^{2} (11.5 sq mi)

Population (2001)
  - Total: 45,469
- Time zone: UTC+6 (BST)

Nangalkot Municipality mahallah geocode map

Nangalkot Municipality is located in Nangalkot Upazila, Comilla District, Bangladesh. The total population is 45,469.
