= Kazi Zaker Husain =

Bangladeshi zoologist

- কাজী জাকের হোসেন
- Born: 1 January 1931; Nangalkot, Tipperah district, Bengal Presidency
- Died: 21 June 2011 (aged 81); Dhaka, Bangladesh

Kazi Zaker Husain (1 January 1931 – 21 June 2011) was a Bangladeshi zoologist. He was awarded Independence Day Award in 1992 by the Government of Bangladesh.

== Career ==
Husain served as a faculty member of the Department of Zoology at the University of Dhaka since 1953. He went on to be the Dean of the Faculty of Biological Science.

Husain wrote three books including Birds of Bangladesh.
