= Mokara Union =

Mokara
- Union
- Location in Bangladesh
- Country: Comilla Bangladesh
- Division: Chittagong Division
- District: Comilla District
- Upazilas: Nangalkot Upazila

Area
  - Total: 65.6 km^{2} (25.3 sq mi)

Population (2001)
  - Total: 20,875
- Time zone: UTC+6 (BST)
- Website: Official Map of Nangalkot

Mokara is a union, the smallest administrative body of Bangladesh, located in Nangalkot Upazila, Comilla District, Bangladesh. The total population is 20,875.
