= Comilla-11 =

Constituency of Bangladesh's Jatiya Sangsad

Coordinates: 23.23°N 91.31°E

- Constituency for the Jatiya Sangsad
- District: Comilla District
- Division: Chittagong Division
- Electorate: 421,632 (2026)

Current constituency
- Created: 1973
- Party: Bangladesh Jamaat-e-Islami
- Member: Syed Abdullah Muhammad Taher
- ← 258 Comilla-10 260 Chandpur-1 →

Comilla-11 is a constituency represented in the Jatiya Sangsad (National Parliament) of Bangladesh since 2026 by Syed Abdullah Muhammad Taher of the Bangladesh Jamaat-e-Islami.

== Boundaries ==
The constituency encompasses Chauddagram Upazila.

== History ==
The constituency was created for the first general elections in newly independent Bangladesh, held in 1973.

Ahead of the 2008 general election, the Election Commission redrew constituency boundaries to reflect population changes revealed by the 2001 Bangladesh census. The 2008 redistricting altered the boundaries of the constituency.

== Members of Parliament ==
Election	Member	Party
1973	Ali Ashraf	Independent
1979	Muzaffar Ahmed	National Awami Party
Major Boundary Changes
1986	Omar Ahmed Majumder	Awami League
1991	AKM Kamruzzaman	Bangladesh Nationalist Party
Jun 1996	Mazibul Hoque	Awami League
2001	Syed Abdullah Mohammed Taher	Bangladesh Jamaat-e-Islami
2008	Mazibul Hoque	Awami League
2014	Mazibul Hoque	Awami League
2018	Mazibul Hoque	Awami League
2024	Mazibul Hoque	Awami League
2026	Syed Abdullah Mohammed Taher	Bangladesh Jamaat-e-Islami

== Elections ==
=== Elections in the 2020s ===
General election 2026: Comilla-11
Party	Candidate	Votes	%	±%
Jamaat	Syed Abdullah Mohammed Taher	133,308	60.73	+54.95
BNP	Md. Kamrul Huda	76,638	34.91	+17.40
Majority		56,670	25.82	−29.03
Turnout		219,511	52.06	−23.46
Registered electors		421,632		
Jamaat gain from AL				

=== Elections in the 2010s ===
General Election 2018: Comilla-11
Party	Candidate	Votes	%	±%
AL	Mazibul Hoque	230,496	72.36	+20.06
BNP	Md. Kamrul Huda	55,782	17.51	−18.79
Jamaat	Syed Abdullah Mohammed Taher	18,420	5.78	−34.52
Majority		174,714	54.85	+42.85
Turnout		318,441	75.52	−5.38
AL hold				

Mazibul Hoque was re-elected unopposed in the 2014 general election after opposition parties withdrew their candidacies in a boycott of the election.

=== Elections in the 2000s ===
General Election 2008: Comilla-11
Party	Candidate	Votes	%	±%
AL	Mazibul Hoque	101,201	52.3	+17.6
Jamaat	Syed Abdullah Mohammed Taher	77,924	40.3	N/A
JP(E)	Kazi Zafar Ahmed	12,980	1.0	N/A
IAB	Md. Kamal Uddin Bhuiyan	1,474	0.8	N/A
Majority		23,277	12.0	−18.0
Turnout		193,579	80.9	+7.1
AL gain from Jamaat				

General Election 2001: Comilla-11
Party	Candidate	Votes	%	±%
Jamaat	Syed Abdullah Muhammad Taher	87,898	64.7	+28.4
AL	Mazibul Hoque	47,176	34.7	−15.2
IJOF	M. Ahidur Rahman	391	0.3	N/A
Independent	Ali Ahmad Mollah	288	0.2	N/A
Independent	Md. Shah Alam	211	0.2	N/A
Majority		40,722	30.0	+16.4
Turnout		135,964	73.8	+15.1
BNP gain from AL				

=== Elections in the 1990s ===
General Election June 1996: Comilla-11
Party	Candidate	Votes	%	±%
AL	Mazibul Hoque	38,382	49.9	+15.4
BNP	AKM Kamruzzaman	27,915	36.3	−4.5
Jamaat	Md. A.J.M. Saleh Uddin Khand	4,884	6.4	−5.3
JP(E)	A.K.M. Moin Uddin Bhuiyan	4,690	6.1	−6.3
Gano Forum	Mokhlesur Rahman Chowdhury	389	0.5	N/A
Zaker Party	Md. Abul Hasem Khandakar	233	0.3	0.0
NAP (Bhashani)	Md. Ali Ashraf Mazumder	218	0.3	N/A
BKA	Md. Abdul Hamid	176	0.2	N/A
Majority		10,467	13.6	+7.3
Turnout		76,877	58.7	+20.4
AL gain from BNP				

General Election 1991: Comilla-11
Party	Candidate	Votes	%	±%
BNP	AKM Kamruzzaman	24,948	40.8	
AL	Md. Joynal Abedin Bhuiyan	21,078	34.5	
JP(E)	Omar Ahmed Majumder	7,608	12.4	
Jamaat	Md. Salah Uddin	7,178	11.7	
Zaker Party	A. Hasem	192	0.3	
Bangladesh Samajtantrik Dal (Khalekuzzaman)	AKM Rafiqul Haider Mazumdar	173	0.3	
Majority		3,870	6.3	
Turnout		61,177	38.3	
BNP gain from AL				
