= Jodda Union =

Jodda
- Union
- Location in Bangladesh
- Coordinates: 23°10′N 91°12′E
- Country: Comilla Bangladesh
- Division: Chittagong Division
- District: Comilla District
- Upazilas: Nangalkot Upazila

Area
  - Total: 29.8 km^{2} (11.5 sq mi)

Population (2001)
  - Total: 34,928
- Time zone: UTC+6 (BST)
- Website: Official Map of Nangalkot

Jodda Union is a union, the smallest administrative body of Bangladesh, located in Nangalkot Upazila, Comilla District, Bangladesh. The total population is 34,928.
