= Satbaria Union (Cumilla District) =

Satbaria
- Union
- Location in Bangladesh
- Country: Bangladesh
- Division: Chittagong Division
- District: Comilla District
- Upazilas: Nangalkot Upazila

Area
  - Total: 9.2 km^{2} (3.6 sq mi)

Population (2001)
  - Total: 7,919
- Time zone: UTC+6 (BST)
- Website: Official Map of Nangalkot

Satbaria is a union, the smallest administrative body of Bangladesh, located in Nangalkot Upazila, Comilla District, Bangladesh. The total population is 7,919.
