= A. K. M. Kamruzzaman =

Bangladeshi politician (1939 or 1940 – 2025)

- এ কে এম কামারুজ্জামান

Member of Bangladesh Parliament
- In office 1991–1996
- Preceded by: Omar Ahmed Majumder
- Succeeded by: Md. Joynal Abedin Bhuiyan

Personal details
- Born: 1939 or 1940
- Died: 19 September 2025 (aged 85) Dhaka, Bangladesh
- Party: Bangladesh Nationalist Party

A. K. M. Kamruzzaman (1939 or 1940 – 19 September 2025) was a Bangladesh Nationalist Party politician who served as a member of parliament.

== Career ==
Kamruzzaman was elected to parliament from Comilla-11 as a Bangladesh Nationalist Party candidate in 1991.

== Death ==
Kamruzzaman died at United Hospital, Dhaka on 19 September 2025, at the age of 85.
