= Kazi Zahirul Qayyum =

Bangladeshi politician

Member of Parliament

Personal details
- Party: Bangladesh Awami League

Kazi Zahirul Qayyum is a Bangladesh Awami League politician and former Member of Parliament.

== Career ==
Qayyum was a member of parliament. He was one of the founders of Awami League in Comilla District. During the Bangladesh Liberation War, he tried to negotiate a truce with Pakistan through the United States that would have prevented the Independence of Bangladesh. He was thwarted by Tajuddin Ahmad.

== Personal life ==
Qayyum's nephew is Jatiya Party politician Kazi Zafar.
