= Omar Ahmed Majumder =

Bangladeshi politician

Omar Ahmed Majumder (8 March 1930 – 9 October 1996) was a Bangladesh Nationalist party (BNP) politician and a former member of parliament for Comilla-11.

== Career ==
Majumder was elected to parliament from Comilla-17 in a 1979 by-election. He was elected to parliament from Comilla-11 as a Bangladesh Nationalist party (BNP) candidate in 1986 and 1988.

He died on 9 October 1996.
