= Muhammad Shujat Ali =

Bangladeshi politician

Member of Parliament

Personal details
- Party: Bangladesh Awami League

Muhammad Shujat Ali is a Bangladesh Awami League politician and the former Member of Parliament.

== Career ==
Ali graduated with a B.A. from the University of Dhaka in 1942. In 1943, he received a commission in the Royal Indian Air Force but later shifted to the Royal Indian Army. He later joined the Pakistan Army after the Partition of India. During his service in the Pakistan Army he earned a War medal and a Pakistan Medal. In 1970 he was elected to the National Assembly of Pakistan. In 1971, after the start of the Bangladesh Liberation war, he joined the Mukti Bahini. In Tripura, he commanded the Palatana Mukti Bahini training camp. On 4 December 1971, he flew the flag of Bangladesh in different areas of Comilla District. He was elected to the first parliament of Bangladesh in 1973.

== Death ==
Ali died in April 2007 in Richardson Regional Medical Centre, Dallas, Texas, United States. He was buried inside the campus of Debidwar Sujat Ali Government College.
