= Sun and 13 Cantons =

Pub in Soho, London

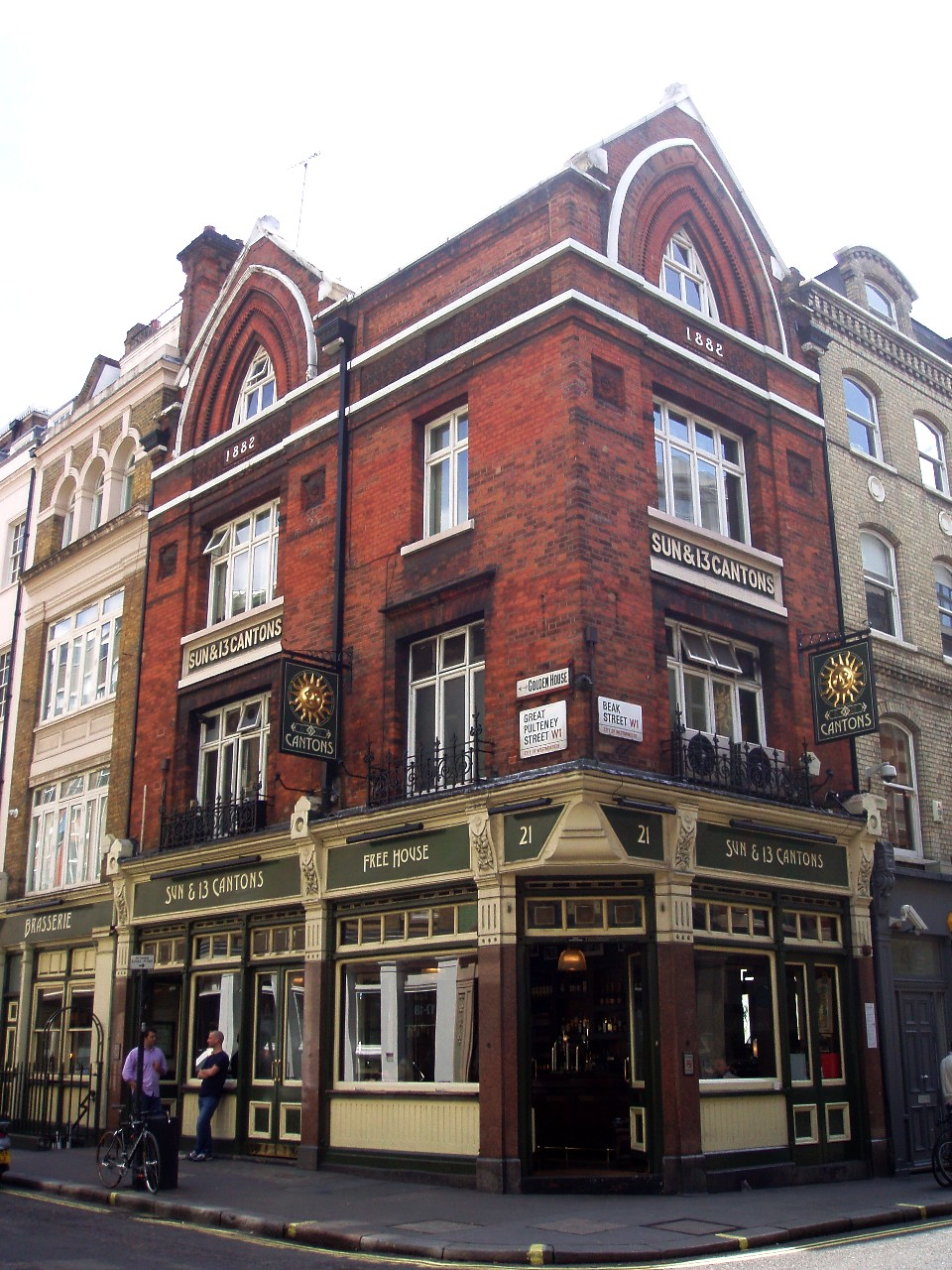
- Sun and 13 Cantons, Soho, London
- Interactive map of Sun and 13 Cantons
- 51°30′45.56″N 0°8′11.77″W
- Type: Public house
- Location: 20 Great Pulteney Street, Soho, London W1

History
- Built: c. 1756
- Rebuilt: 1882

Site notes
- Architect: Henry Cotton

Listed Building – Grade II
- Official name: SUN AND 13 CANTONS PUBLIC HOUSE
- Designated: 23-Nov-1978
- Reference no.: 1213696

The Sun and 13 Cantons is a Grade II listed public house at 20 Great Pulteney Street, Soho, London W1.

The pub, which takes its name from Swiss woollen merchants who used to be based nearby, has operated on this site since at least 1756. During that year it appears in Freemasonry records as a Masonic Lodge meeting place.

The present building dates to 1882, and the architect was Henry Cotton.

The actor John Hurt lived above the pub at one period.
