= Chauddagram Upazila =

Region of Chittagong Division, Bangladesh

Chauddagram চৌদ্দগ্রাম
- Upazila
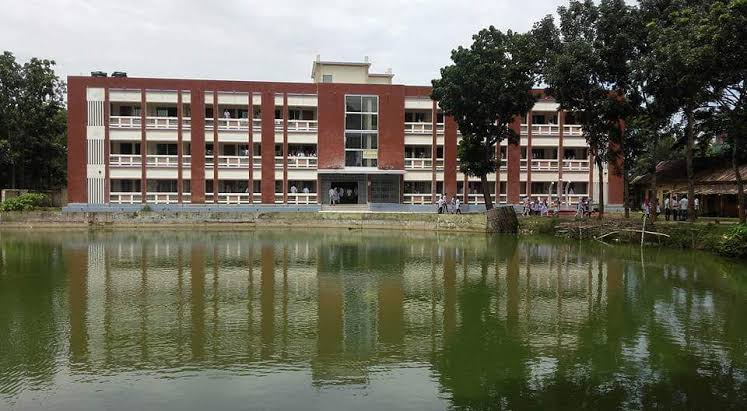
- Chouddagram Govt. College

- Coordinates: 23°13.7′N 91°18.8′E
- Country: Bangladesh
- Division: Chittagong
- District: Comilla
- Upazilla established: 1983
- Municipality established: 2003

Government
  - Type: Mayor–Council
  - Body: Chauddagram Municipality
  - City Mayor: G.M. Mir Hosen Miru (Awami League)
  - Previous Mayor: Mizanur Rahman

Area
  - Total: 271.73 km^{2} (104.92 sq mi)

Population (2022)
  - Total: 501,815
  - Density: 1,846.7/km^{2} (4,783.0/sq mi)
- Time zone: UTC+6 (BST)
- Postal code: 3550
- Area code: 08020
- Website: chauddagram.comilla.gov.bd

Chauddagram Upazila mauza geocode map

Chauddagram (Bengali: চৌদ্দগ্রাম) is an upazila of Cumilla District in the Division of Chittagong, Bangladesh. It also a Municipality under Cumilla District.

== History ==
From this region, a lot of revenue was collected in the King's treasury. The generous King also did a lot of good deeds in this area. The large reservoirs and dig of Chauddagram bear their identity. At that time, different geographical regions were called Parganas for the purpose of rent collection. Upazila was also a pargana headquarter at Chauddagram. As this pargana was established with fourteen villages, it was named Chauddagram. Later, when the thana was established in 1905, the whole thana was renamed Chauddagram after the name of the center.

== Language and Culture ==
The geo-nature and geographical location of the Chauddagram Upazila have played a role in shaping the language and culture of the people of this Upazila. Located in the south-eastern part of Bangladesh, this Upazila is surrounded by the Indian state of Tripura, Dhaka division, and other Upazilas of the Chittagong division. Here the main characteristics of the dialect are the same as in other Upazilas of Bangladesh, yet some diversity can be found. For example, in the spoken language, the sound of great life is largely absent, that is, there is a tendency to simplify the language. The regional Bengali dialect of Chauddagram Upazila is very similar to the dialect of the Dhaka region, the regional dialect of Laksam Upazila has some similarities to the dialect of the Noakhali area. Experts believe that Chauddagram has had a huge impact on the culture of Comilla district. The civilization of Chauddagram Upazila is very old. The archaeological artifacts found in this area and the ruins of the Buddhist Vihara are known to be the bearers of ancient civilizations.

== Geography ==
Chauddagram is South East of Dhaka. It is on the Southern part of Comilla. The upazila is bordered by Comilla Sadar Dakshin upazila on the north, Lalmai and Nangalkot upazilas on the west, Feni Sadar upazila of Feni district to the south, and South Tripura and Siphahijala districts of the Indian state of Tripura to the east.

== Administration ==
Chauddagram Upazila is divided into Chauddagram Municipality and 13 union parishads: Alkara, Batisha, Cheora, Ghulpasha, Gunabati, Jagannatdighi, Kalikapur, Kankapait, Kashinagar, Moonshirhat, Shuvapur, Sreepur, and Ujirpur. The union parishads are subdivided into 363 mauzas and 403 villages.

Chauddagram Municipality is subdivided into 9 wards and 27 mahallas.

== Demographics ==
Religions in Chauddagram Upazila (2022)
Religion	Percent
Islam	98.20%
Hinduism	1.72%
Other or not stated	0.08%

According to the 2022 Bangladeshi census, Chauddagram Upazila had 112,835 households and a population of 501,815. 10.96% of the population were under 5 years of age. Chauddagram had a literacy rate (age 7 and over) of 79.29%: 80.43% for males and 78.37% for females, and a sex ratio of 83.63 males for every 100 females. 51,500 (10.26%) lived in urban areas.

According to the 2011 Census of Bangladesh, Chauddagram Upazila had 87,475 households and a population of 443,648. 110,005 (24.80%) were under 10 years of age. Chauddagram has a literacy rate (age 7 and over) of 56.90%, compared to the national average of 51.8%, and a sex ratio of 1131 females per 1000 males. 38,317 (8.64%) lived in urban areas.

== Education ==
Schools:

- Chauddagram H. J. Govt. Pilot Model High School (1921)
- Chouddagram Secondary Pilot Girls High School
- Chandkora Sakandar Ali Secondary School ( Ariful Rahman Ohe)
- Kankapait School (Founder - Munshi Muhammad Ibrahim)
- Cheora B.F High School
- Bijoykara School and College est- School -1970 and College - 1992 (Founder - Aga MD Aminul Islam Chowdhury)
- Batisa Secondary School, founded in 1926
- Munsirhat High School (1954)
- Dhorkara High School (1969)
- Khironshal Kazi Jafar Ahmed High School
- Payer Khola High School (1882)
- Gunabati M/L High School
- Tarashail High School
- Munshirhat High School
- Padua Sufia Rahman High School (1966).

Colleges:

- Chauddagram Government College
- Chauddagram Government Technical School And College
- Al Haj Noor Mia University College
- Cheora Government College
- Chauddagram Model College

Madrasha:

- Chauddagram Nazmia Kamil Madrasha (1901)
- Cheora Ajgaria Fazil Madrasha

== See also ==
- Upazilas of Bangladesh
- Districts of Bangladesh
- Divisions of Bangladesh
