= Mirza Abdul Awal =

Bangladeshi politician

- মীর্জা আব্দুল আউয়াল

Member of the Bangladesh Parliament for Pabna-8 (now Pabna-1)
- In office 18 February 1979 – 12 February 1982
- Preceded by: Abu Sayeed
- Succeeded by: Monzur Kader

Member of the East Bengal Legislative Assembly
- In office March 1954 – 1958
- Preceded by: A. M. A. Hamid

Personal details
- Born: Bera, Pabna District
- Party: Bangladesh Nationalist Party
- Relatives: Mirza Abdul Halim (brother); Mirza Abdul Jalil (brother); Manzur Quader (nephew)

Mirza Abdul Awal (Bengali: মীর্জা আব্দুল আউয়াল) is a Bangladesh Nationalist Party politician and a former member of parliament for Pabna-8.

== Early life and family ==
Abdul Awal was born into a Bengali Muslim family of Mirzas in the village of Jainagar in Bera, Pabna District. His brother, Mirza Abdul Halim, was a former parliamentarian who served as the opposition minister of state for shipping. His other brother, Mirza Abdul Jalil, was a former president of the Bangladesh Krishak League. The retired army major Manzur Quader is his nephew.

== Career ==
Abdul Awal competed in the 1954 East Bengal Legislative Assembly election and successfully won a seat at the East Bengal Legislative Assembly. He was involved in the Bengali language movement and six point movement during the Pakistan period.

Following the independence of Bangladesh, he sought election to parliament, unsuccessfully, in 1973 as a National Awami Party (Bhashani) candidate.

He was elected to the 2nd Jatiya Sangsad from Pabna-8 (Bera-Santhia; now Pabna-1) as a Bangladesh Nationalist Party candidate following the 1979 Bangladeshi general election. Abdul Awal contested for Pabna-1 at the 1991 Bangladeshi general election, losing to Motiur Rahman Nizami.
