= Mirza Abdul Halim =

Bangladeshi politician (died 2021)

- মীর্জা আব্দুল হালিম

Minister of State for Ports, Shipping and I.W.T.
- In office 24 November 1979 – 24 November 1981
- President: Ziaur Rahman; Abdus Sattar
- Prime Minister: Shah Azizur Rahman

Minister of State
- In office 15 April 1979 – 24 April 1980
- President: Ziaur Rahman
- Prime Minister: Shah Azizur Rahman

Member of the Bangladesh Parliament for Pabna-12
- In office 18 February 1979 – 12 February 1982
- Preceded by: Amjad Hossain
- Succeeded by: Constituency abolished

Personal details
- Born: 1927 or 1928 Bera, Pabna District, Bengal Presidency
- Died: 9 July 2021 (aged 93) Bangladesh
- Party: Bangladesh Nationalist Party
- Relatives: Mirza Abdul Awal (brother); Mirza Abdul Jalil (brother); Manzur Quader (nephew)

Mirza Abdul Halim (Bengali: মির্জা আব্দুল হালিম; 1927/8 – 9 July 2021) was a Bangladeshi footballer and politician. He was a Bangladesh National Party member of parliament from 1979 to 1982.

== Early life and family ==
Mirza Abdul Halim was born into a Bengali Muslim family of Mirzas in the village of Joynagar in Kaitula, Bera, Pabna District, then part of the Bengal Presidency. He had two sons and one daughter. His brother, Mirza Abdul Awal, was a former parliamentarian. His other brother, Mirza Abdul Jalil, was a former president of the Bangladesh Krishak League. The retired army major Manzur Quader is his nephew.

== Career ==
Abdul Halim was a footballer from Victoria SC. He contested the 1979 Bangladeshi general election as a Bangladesh Nationalist Party candidate and was elected to parliament from the Pabna-12 constituency. He was the state minister for shipping in the first cabinet of President Ziaur Rahman.

== Death ==
Abdul Halim died on 9 July 2021 at the age of 93.
