= Mirza Abdul Jalil =

Bangladeshi economist and politician of Awami League (born 1937)

- মীর্জা আব্দুল জলিল
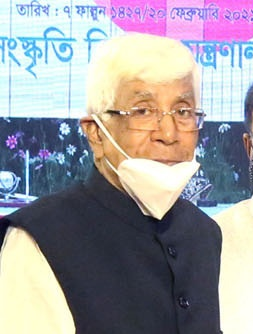
- Mirza Abdul Jalil in 2021

Chairman of Bangladesh Krishi Bank
- In office 1996–2001

President of Bangladesh Krishak League
- Succeeded by: Rashed Mosharraf

Personal details
- Born: 19 March 1937 (age 89) Bera, Pabna District, Bengal Presidency
- Party: Awami League
- Relatives: Mirza Abdul Halim (brother); Mirza Abdul Awal (brother); Manzur Quader (nephew)

Mirza Abdul Jalil (born 19 March 1937) is a Bangladeshi economist and politician of Awami League.

== Early life and family ==
Mirza Abdul Jalil was born on 19 March 1937 to a Bengali Muslim family of Mirzas in the village of Joynagar in Bera, Pabna District, then part of the Bengal Presidency. His brothers Mirza Abdul Halim and Mirza Abdul Awal were former parliamentarians associated with the Bangladesh Nationalist Party. The retired army major Manzur Quader is his nephew.

During his student life, Abdul Jalil was elected joint secretary of the All Pakistan Students Union in 1962.

== Career ==
Jalil started his career as 1986 at the Department of Livestock. He retired from government service in 1994. From 1996 to 2001, he served as the chairperson of Bangladesh Krishi Bank.

Jalil was nominated from Awami League to contest the 8th parliamentary election in 2001 from Pabna-2. He lost the election to AKM Salim Reza Habib, the Bangladesh Nationalist Party candidate. On 22 December 2006, he led a procession of 200 Awami League activists through Dhaka as part of Awami League's protests for fair election. The demonstrators clashed with police near Mirpur and a police car was set on fire. The police were support by Bangladesh Army soldiers, the first time since the presidendency of Hussain Mohammad Ershad. Jalil was detained and sent to Dhaka Central Jail by a Dhaka court on charges under Speedy Trial (Law and Order Disruption) Act.

Jalil served as a secretary in the Ministry of Science and Technology of the government of Bangladesh and specialised in agriculture. He is a former president of Bangladesh Krishak League, the farmers wing of Awami League. In 2008 he sought the nomination of Awami League to contest 9th parliamentary elections from Pabna-2. The nomination went to A. K. Khandker who was elected to parliament in the election.

Jalil is also a former member of the advisory council of Awami League. He was appointed the chairperson of Bangladesh Privatisation Commission in 2009. In January 2011, he stated that the government planned to save state pwned enterprises through privatisation. On 21 December 2011, he called for an establishment of a strong regional network in South Asia to address climate change. The Bangladesh Privatisation Commission was merged with the Board of Investment to form Bangladesh Investment Development Authority in 2016. He sought the nomination from Awami League to contest the 2018 general election from Pabna.

Jali was awarded the Ekushey Padak in 2021 in economics.
