= Nagarbari-Mohanganj Dolphin Sanctuary =

Dolphin Sanctuary in Bangladesh

- IUCN category VI (protected area with sustainable use of natural resources)
- Location within Bangladesh
- Location: Pabna, Rajshahi, Bangladesh
- Coordinates: 23.9496°N 89.6564°E
- Area: 408.11 ha (1,008.5 acres)
- Established: 1 December 2013

Nagarbari-Mohanganj Dolphin Sanctuary (Bengali: নগরবাড়ি-মোহনগঞ্জ শুশুক অভয়ারণ্য) is a dolphin sanctuary located at Bera Upazila under Pabna District of Bangladesh. It is one of the three river-based dolphin sanctuaries in Padma-Jamuna confluence, the others being the Nazirganj Dolphin Sanctuary and the Shilanda-Nagdemra Dolphin Sanctuary. The area of the sanctuary is 408.11 ha (1,008.5 acres). Home to the endangered freshwater Ganges river dolphins, it was officially declared as a wildlife sanctuary by the government of Bangladesh on 1 December 2013.

== See also ==
- List of wildlife sanctuaries of Bangladesh
