= Motiur Rahman Nizami =

Bangladeshi politician convicted of war crimes (1943–2016)

- মতিউর রহমান নিজামী
- Nizami in 2010

2nd Ameer of Bangladesh Jamaat-e-Islami
- In office 6 March 2001 – 11 May 2016
- Preceded by: Ghulam Azam
- Succeeded by: Maqbul Ahmed

Minister of Agriculture
- In office 10 October 2001 – 22 May 2003
- President: Badruddoza Chowdhury; Iajuddin Ahmed
- Prime Minister: Khaleda Zia
- Succeeded by: M. K. Anwar

Minister of Industries
- In office 22 May 2003 – 28 October 2006
- President: Badruddoza Chowdhury; Iajuddin Ahmed
- Prime Minister: Khaleda Zia
- Preceded by: Rezaul Karim Mannan
- Succeeded by: Tapan Chowdhury (as adviser)

Member of the Bangladesh Parliament for Pabna-1
- In office 1 October 2001 – 28 October 2006
- Preceded by: Abu Sayeed
- Succeeded by: Shamsul Hoque Tuku
- In office 27 February 1991 – 16 February 1996
- Preceded by: Manzur Quader
- Succeeded by: Abu Sayeed

Personal details
- Born: 31 March 1943 Santhia, Pabna, Bengal, British India
- Died: 11 May 2016 (aged 73) Old Dhaka Central Jail, Dhaka, Bangladesh
- Cause of death: Execution by hanging
- Party: Bangladesh Jamaat-e-Islami
- Spouse: Shamsunnahar Nizami
- Children: 6 (including Nazibur Rahman Momen)
- Education: University of Dhaka
- Profession: Politician, scholar

Motiur Rahman Nizami (Bengali: মতিউর রহমান নিজামী; 31 March 1943 – 11 May 2016) was a Bangladeshi politician, Islamic scholar, and former ameer of Bangladesh Jamaat-e-Islami, who served as the Minister of Agriculture and Minister of Industry. He was also a member of parliament from the Pabna-1 constituency from 1991 to 1996 and again from 2001 to 2006.

He was in charge of Al-Badr during the Bangladesh War of Independence. On 29 October 2014, he was convicted of masterminding the Demra massacre by the International Crimes Tribunal. While various political entities had originally welcomed the trials, in November 2011, Human Rights Watch criticised the government for aspects of their progress, lack of transparency, and purported harassment of defense lawyers and witnesses representing the accused. Nizami was the last high-profile suspect to be tried for war crimes of the 1971 Bangladesh genocide; the court delayed his verdict in June 2014 because of the state of his health.

In 2004, Nizami was convicted under separate charges for arms trafficking to Assam, India, and was sentenced to death, along with 13 other men, in January 2014. On 18 December 2024, the HC acquitted Nizami in the arms smuggling case filed over the sensational 10-truck arms haul in Chattogram, observing that there was nothing in the police report regarding who had smuggled the arms, from whom, and where.

On 29 October 2014, he was convicted and sentenced to death for his role in masterminding the Demra massacre, in which 800–900 unarmed Hindu civilians were killed and the rape of women. He was executed by hanging at Dhaka Central Jail on 11 May 2016. He is the third minister of Bangladesh to be hanged. He was frequently listed on The 500 Most Influential Muslims.

== Early life and education ==
Maulana Nizami was born in Pabna District on 31 March 1943. He completed his primary education in his home village of Manmathpur, and then studied at Boailmari Madrasah, Santhia. He passed the 'Dakhil' examination with first class in 1955. Afterwards he stood sixteenth at the 'Alim' (equivalent to Matriculation) examination from the then East Pakistan Madrasah Education Board in 1959. Then he passed the 'Fazil' (Honours) examination with first class in 1961. He obtained a 'Kamil' (Masters) in Fiqh (Islamic Law) degree with first class from Madrasah-e-Alia, Dhaka, in 1963,f where he secured the second place in the Education Board. He also graduated from Dhaka University (DU) in 1967.

== Political career ==
Nizami rose in the ranks of the East Pakistan branch of Jamaat-e-Islami Pakistan in the 1960s, having led the student organization, East Pakistan Islami Chhatra Sangha (now Islami Chhatra Shibir). After the independence of Bangladesh, the new regime in power banned all religion-based political parties, including Jamaat-e-Islami. After the assassination by military officers of Sheikh Mujibur Rahman in August 1975, Ziaur Rahman became president in a coup in 1977. He permitted top Jamaat leaders, such as Ghulam Azam and Nizami, to return to Bangladesh in 1978; they revived Jamaat-e-Islami, which became the largest Islamist party in the country. Nizami emerged as a key leader of the Jamaat, organising the Islami Chhatra Shibir, which serves as the student wing of Jamaat.

In 1991, he was elected as a member of parliament, representing Jamaat-e-Islami for the constituency of Pabna-1; he was Jamaat's Parliamentary Party leader until 1994. During the June 1996 elections, he lost to the candidates of both the Bangladesh Nationalist Party (BNP), an ally of Jamaat, and the Awami League in his constituency. Professor Abu Sayed of the Awami League gained his seat.

In 1971, Nizami was a chief of the infamous Al-Badr militia. Along with the Pakistan Army, this militia abducted and massacred 989 Bengali intellectuals, including professors, journalists, litterateurs, doctors and activists in general.

=== Leader of Jamaat-e-Islami ===
Nizami took over as the leader of Jamaat from Ghulam Azam in 2001. In the same year, representing his party as part of a four-party alliance including BNP, Nizami won a seat in Parliament in Pabna-1, receiving 57.68% of the votes. From 2001 to 2003, he served as the Minister of Agriculture, then as the Minister of Industry from 2003 to 2006.

Nizami was defeated in the December 2008 general election as a candidate of the Four-Party Alliance, losing his seat for Pabna-1 to Md. Shamsul Haque of the Awami League. Nizami received 45.6% of the votes. The Awami League took two-thirds of the seats in Parliament.

== Controversies ==
=== Allegations of corruption ===
In May 2008, the Anti-Corruption Commission of Bangladesh indicted Nizami in the GATCO Corruption case, in which he, along with several other politicians, was alleged to have illegally granted a container-depot contract to the local firm GATCO. A warrant was issued to arrest Nizami along with 12 others on 15 May 2008. Nizami was charged with conspiring with 12 other politicians to award the contract to GATCO, although the company did not meet the conditions of the tender. The prosecution alleged that the deal with GATCO caused a total loss of more than 100 million Bangladeshi Taka to the government. Nizami denied the charges and said they were "politically motivated". He was released after two months on bail.

=== Blasphemy charges ===
In a public speech on 17 March 2010, the Dhaka Jamaat chief, Rafiqul Islam, compared Nizami's life to that of the Islamic prophet Muhammad, persisting in the face of persecution. On 21 March, the Bangladesh Tariqat Federation sued Rafiqul, Nizami and other Jamaat members "for hurting Islamic sentiments of the masses by comparing Nizami with the Prophet".

Nizami, along with three other senior Jamaat leaders, was arrested on charges on 29 March 2010. He secured bail the next day and appealed for dismissal of the case on 14 February 2011. The High Court adjourned the case for four months in March 2011.

=== Smuggling charges ===
On 4 May 2011, Nizami was arrested on allegations of smuggling arms to Assamese insurgents in India in 2004. His bail petition on 7 September 2011 was denied.

On 30 January 2014, Nizami and 13 co-conspirators were sentenced to death by hanging after being found guilty of smuggling arms. On 18 December 2024, the HC acquitted Nizami in the arms smuggling case filed over the sensational 10-truck arms haul in Chattogram, observing that there was nothing in the police report regarding who had smuggled the arms, from whom, and where.

== International Crimes Tribunal ==
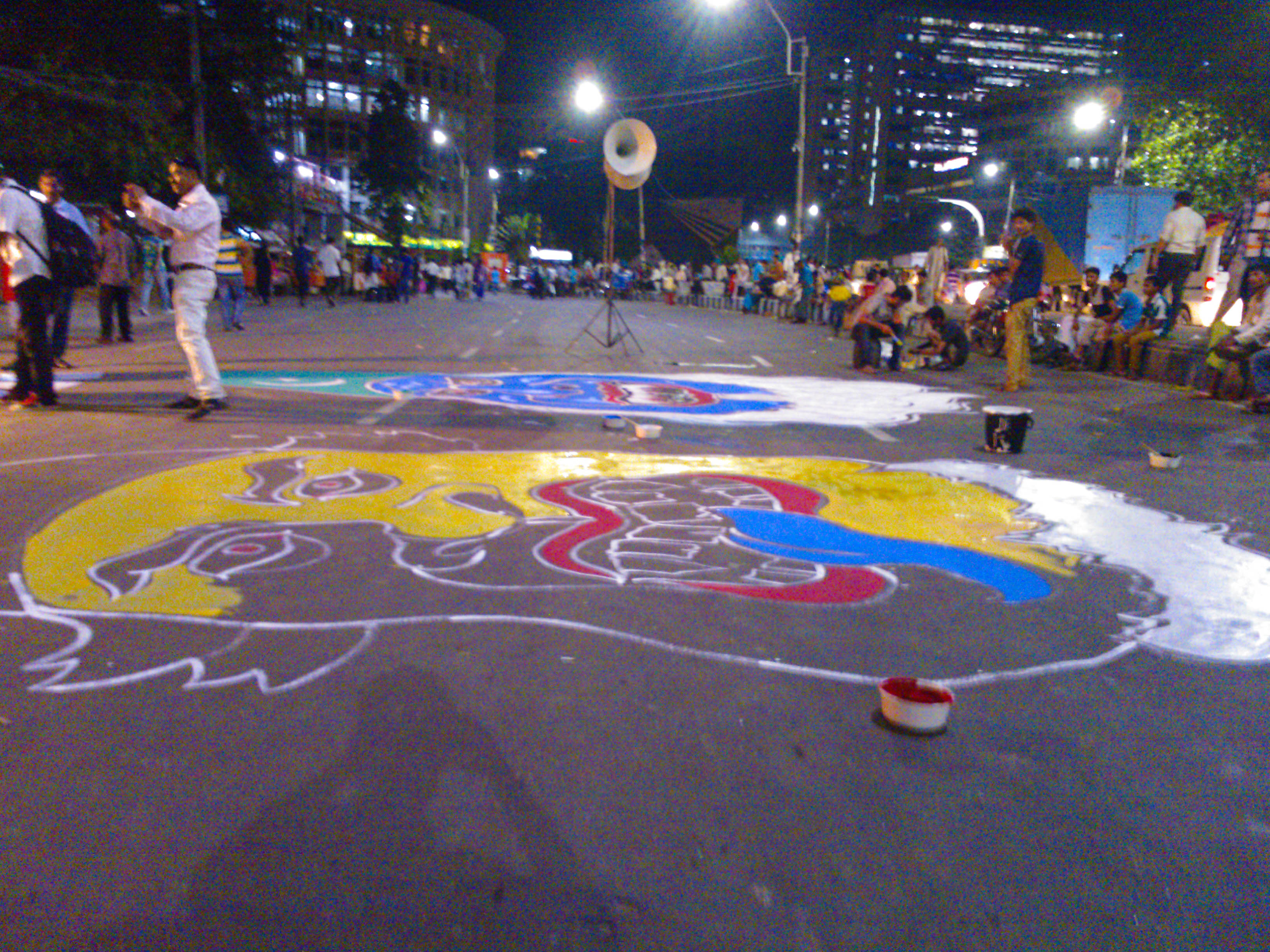
GonoJagoron Moncho is demanding the death penalty of Nizami on 4 May 2016.

In 2009, the Awami League-led government established a tribunal in Bangladesh to investigate those suspected of committing atrocities during the war in 1971. Nizami and eight other leaders of Jamaat-e-Islami were charged with war crimes by the prosecution, as were two leaders of the Bangladesh Nationalist Party. Opposition parties and human rights groups alleged political interference in the trial, given that all the accused were leading opposition politicians. Nizami was the last high-profile suspect to be tried for 1971 war crimes; the court delayed his verdict in June 2014 because of the state of his health. On 29 October 2014, it was announced that Nizami had been sentenced to death for various war crimes, including genocide, murder, torture and rape committed during the 1971 war in support of Pakistan.

== Death ==
On 11 May 2016, Nizami was hanged at Old Dhaka Central Jail, just days after the nation's highest court dismissed his final appeal to overturn the death sentence for atrocities committed during the country's 1971 war for liberation. He was hanged just before midnight (18:00 GMT) after he refused to seek mercy from the President of Bangladesh. He was executed between 11:50 pm and 12:01 am midnight. He was buried at his family's home in northern Bangladesh.

=== Reaction ===
Pakistan: Pakistan's foreign office said in a statement the following: "Pakistan is deeply saddened over the hanging of the emir of Jamaat-i-Islami Bangladesh, Mr Motiur Rahman Nizami, for the alleged crimes committed before December 1971. His only sin was upholding the constitution and laws of Pakistan".

Turkey: Turkey condemned the execution of Motiur Rahman Nizami and withdrew the Turkish ambassador from Bangladesh.

== See also ==
- Abul A'la Maududi

Political offices
Preceded by Ghulam Azam	Ameer of Jamaat-e-Islami Bangladesh; 2001–2016	Succeeded by Maqbul Ahmed
