= Jahurul Islam Talukdar =

Bangladeshi politician

Member of Parliament for Pabna-1
- In office 1979–1982
- Preceded by: Muhammad Mansur Ali
- Succeeded by: Manzur Quader

Personal details
- Born: 1921 or 1922 (age 103–104)
- Party: Bangladesh Nationalist Party

Jahurul Islam Talukdar (born 1921 or 1922) is a Bangladesh Nationalist Party politician and former member of parliament for Pabna-1.

== Career ==
Talukdar was elected to parliament for Pabna-1 as a Bangladesh Nationalist Party candidate in the 1979 Bangladeshi general election.
