= Aminpur, Bangladesh =

Village in Pabna District, Bangladesh

Coordinates: 23.9155°N 89.6215°E

Aminpur is a village in the Jatsakhni Union of Bera Upazila in Pabna District, Bangladesh. It is now under Aminpur Thana. It is located on the banks of the Attrai River, along national highway N5 between Kazirhat Launch Terminal and Kashinathpur. According to the 2011 Bangladesh census, it had 962 households and a population of 4,130. The postal code is 6682.

In May 2013, the National Implementation Committee for Administrative Reforms (NICAR) decided to upgrade the Aminpur Investigation Centre into a full-fledged police station covering eight unions of the upazila. The police station opened in October 2013. Aminpur has one secondary school, Aminpur Ayen Uddin High School, founded in 1967, which serves 1,200 students.

== See also ==
- List of villages in Bangladesh
