= Shilanda-Nagdemra Dolphin Sanctuary =

Dolphin Sanctuary in Bangladesh

- IUCN category VI (protected area with sustainable use of natural resources)
- Location within Bangladesh
- Location: Pabna, Rajshahi, Bangladesh
- Coordinates: 24.141763°N 89.508988°E
- Area: 24.17 ha (59.7 acres)
- Established: 1 December 2013

Shilanda-Nagdemra Dolphin Sanctuary (Bengali: শিলন্দা নাগডেমড়া শুশুক অভয়ারণ্য) is a wildlife sanctuary located at Santhia Upazila under Pabna District of Bangladesh. It is one of the three river-based dolphin sanctuaries in Padma-Jamuna confluence, the others being the Nazirganj Dolphin Sanctuary and the Nagarbari-Mohanganj Dolphin Sanctuary. The area of the sanctuary is 24.17 ha (59.7 acres). Home to the endangered freshwater Ganges river dolphins, it was officially declared as a wildlife sanctuary by the government of Bangladesh on 1 December 2013.

== See also ==
- List of wildlife sanctuaries of Bangladesh
