= Nazibur Rahman Momen =

Bangladeshi politician (born 1981)

- নাজিবুর রহমান মোমেন
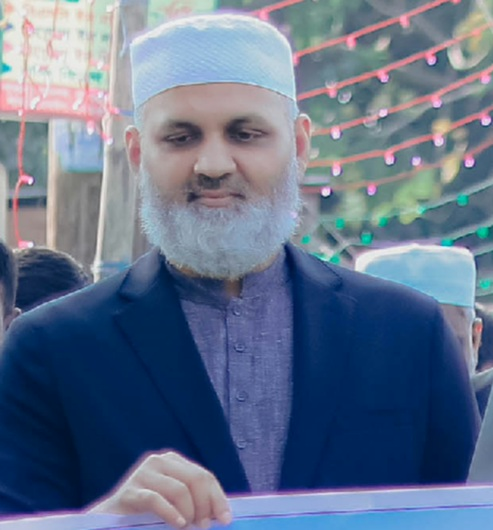
- Momen in 2024

Member of Parliament
- Incumbent
- Assumed office 17 February 2026
- Preceded by: Shamsul Hoque Tuku
- Constituency: Pabna-1

Personal details
- Born: 1 March 1981 (age 45) Santhia, Pabna, Rajshahi
- Party: Bangladesh Jamaat-e-Islami
- Parent: Motiur Rahman Nizami (father)
- Occupation: Lawyer and politician
- Website: www.nazibmomen.com

Nazibur Rahman Momen (born 1 March 1981) is a Bangladeshi barrister, former lecturer at Queen Mary, University of London and politician who is serving as a Member of Parliament for the Pabna-1 constituency.

== See also ==
- List of members of the 13th Jatiya Sangsad
