= Murzin =

Murzin (Russian: Мурзин, IPA: [mʊrˈzʲin]) is a Russian masculine surname originating from the word Murza, meaning Tatar prince. Its feminine counterpart is Murzina. The surname Murza (alternative: Morza) itself originates from the historical title and name Mirza. Notable persons with the surname include:

- Dave Murzin (born 1963), American realtor and politician
- Elena Murzina (born 1984), Russian rhythmic gymnast
- Leonid Murzin (1930–1996), Soviet and Russian linguist
- Volodar Murzin (born 2006), Russian chess player
- Yevgen Murzin (born 1965), Soviet and Ukrainian basketball player and coach
- Yevgeny Murzin (1914–1970), Russian audio engineer
