= Pabna-1 =

Constituency of Bangladesh's Jatiya Sangsad

Coordinates: 24.05°N 89.55°E

- Constituency for the Jatiya Sangsad
- District: Pabna District
- Division: Rajshahi Division
- Electorate: 377,706 (2018)

Current constituency
- Created: 1973
- Party: Bangladesh Jamaat-e-Islami
- Member: Nazibur Rahman Momen
- ← 67 Sirajganj-6 69 Pabna-2 →

Pabna-1 is a constituency represented in the Jatiya Sangsad (National Parliament) of Bangladesh since 2026 by Nazibur Rahman Momen of the Bangladesh Jamaat-e-Islami.

== Boundaries ==
The constituency encompasses Santhia Upazila.

== History ==
The constituency was created for the first general elections in newly independent Bangladesh, held in 1973.

As of 2008, the constituency encompassed Santhia Upazila, Bera Municipality, and four union parishads of Bera Upazila: Chakla, Haturia Nakalia, Kytola, and Nutan Bharenga.

Ahead of the 2026 general election, the Election Commission reduced the boundaries of the constituency by removing the portion of Bera Upazila that it used to contain. The change was challenged in court, but ultimately upheld.

== Members of Parliament ==
Election	Member	Party
1973	Muhammad Mansur Ali	Awami League
1979	Jahurul Islam Talukdar	Bangladesh Nationalist Party
Major Boundary Changes
1986	Manzur Quader	Jatiya Party
1991	Matiur Rahman Nizami	Bangladesh Jamaat-e-Islami
Feb 1996	Manzur Quader	Bangladesh Nationalist Party
Jun 1996	Abu Sayeed	Awami League
2001	Matiur Rahman Nizami	Bangladesh Jamaat-e-Islami
2008	Shamsul Hoque Tuku	Awami League
2026	Nazibur Rahman Momen	Bangladesh Jamaat-e-Islami

== Elections ==
=== Elections in the 2010s ===
General Election 2014: Pabna-1
Party	Candidate	Votes	%	±%
AL	Shamsul Hoque Tuku	67,029	59.1	+5.4
Independent	Abu Sayeed	44,579	39.3	N/A
WPB	Nazrul Islam	1,093	1.0	N/A
JP(E)	Yasin Arafat	661	0.6	N/A
Majority		22,450	19.8	+11.6
Turnout		113,362	34.0	−57.2
AL hold				

=== Elections in the 2000s ===
General Election 2008: Pabna-1
Party	Candidate	Votes	%	±%
AL	Shamsul Hoque Tuku	145,012	53.7	+12.1
Jamaat	Matiur Rahman Nizami	122,944	45.6	−12.1
IAB	Abdul Motin	1,049	0.4	N/A
National People's Party	Rezaul Karim	624	0.2	N/A
Majority		22,068	8.2	−7.9
Turnout		269,629	91.2	+9.4
AL gain from Jamaat				

General Election 2001: Pabna-1
Party	Candidate	Votes	%	±%
Jamaat	Matiur Rahman Nizami	135,982	57.7	+33.8
AL	Abu Sayeed	98,113	41.6	+0.1
IJOF	Quari Sharif Ahmmed	1,347	0.6	N/A
Independent	Md. Abdul Hakim Bos	317	0.1	N/A
Majority		37,869	16.1	+7.8
Turnout		235,759	81.8	−2.4
Jamaat gain from AL				

=== Elections in the 1990s ===
General Election June 1996: Pabna-1
Party	Candidate	Votes	%	±%
AL	Abu Sayeed	73,335	41.5	N/A
BNP	Monzur Kader	58,652	33.2	+16.8
Jamaat	Matiur Rahman Nizami	42,265	23.9	−13.0
JP(E)	Md. Anwar Hossian	1,231	0.7	−10.8
IOJ	Sayeef Uddin Yahia	902	0.5	N/A
Independent	Deqan Sultan Mahmud	198	0.1	N/A
FP	Shek Abdul Aziz	99	0.1	N/A
Majority		14,683	8.3	+4.5
Turnout		176,682	84.2	+18.8
AL gain from Jamaat				

General Election 1991: Pabna-1
Party	Candidate	Votes	%	±%
Jamaat	Matiur Rahman Nizami	55,707	36.9	
BAKSAL	Abu Sayeed	49,923	33.0	
BNP	Mirza Abdul Auwal	24,812	16.4	
JP(E)	Monzur Kader	17,451	11.5	
Zaker Party	Md. Golam Nobi	2,079	1.4	
NAP (Muzaffar)	Md. Ahad Ali	448	0.3	
Independent	Shamsul Haq	416	0.3	
BKA	Md. Nazrul Islam	332	0.2	
Majority		5,784	3.8	
Turnout		151,158	65.4	
Jamaat gain from JP(E)				
