= Murse =

Murse may refer to:

- Moers, city in Germany, spelled Murse in archaic Dutch
- A man's handbag (portmanteau word from "male purse")
- A male nurse

== See also ==
- Mirza, Persian title, a prince or educated man, variant spelling
