= Bera Municipality =

Coordinates: 24°04′37″N 89°36′56″E

Bera Municipality is the municipal capital of Bera Upazila in Bangladesh. The municipality has nine wards and 26 mahallas. It has a population of 50,068 and a literacy rate of 52.2 percent.

== Politics ==
Bangladesh Police detained mayor Md Abdul Baten on 21 March 2008 on corruption charges. In September 2015, the Anti-Corruption Commission sued Mayor Mayor Md Abdul Baten. He was charged with embezzling 18.5 million BDT. The Daily Star reported he was suspended but returned to office before the case could be dispose.

The Ministry of Local Government, Rural Development and Co-operatives suspended the mayor of Bera Municipality Abdul Baten for assaulting Upazila Nirbahi Officer Asif Anam Siddiquee in October 2020 after demanding a share of the revenue from the local port. The mayor is also the brother of Shamsul Haque Tuku. The mayor had also been running a private illegal port. It was destroyed by Bangladesh Inland Water Transport Authority in December 20019.
