= Shamsul Hoque Tuku =

Bangladeshi politician

- শামসুল হক টুকু
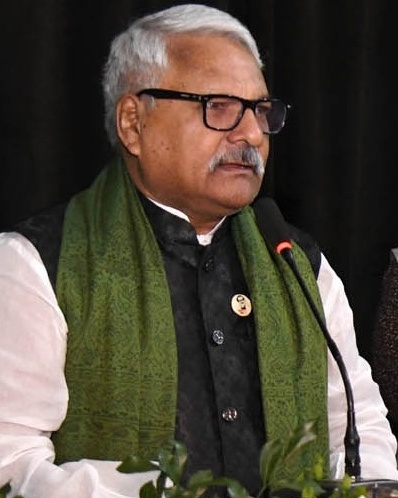
- Tuku in 2022

13th Deputy Speaker of the Jatiya Sangsad
- In office 28 August 2022 – 6 August 2024
- Speaker: Shirin Sharmin Chaudhury
- Preceded by: Fazle Rabbi Miah
- Succeeded by: Kayser Kamal

Member of Parliament
- In office 6 January 2009 – 6 August 2024
- Preceded by: Motiur Rahman Nizami
- Succeeded by: Nazibur Rahman Momen
- Constituency: Pabna-1

Minister of State for Home Affairs
- In office 31 July 2009 – 12 January 2014
- President: Zillur Rahman; Mohammad Abdul Hamid
- Prime Minister: Sheikh Hasina
- Preceded by: Sohel Taj
- Succeeded by: Khoda Baksh Chowdhury (Special Assistant)

Personal details
- Born: 31 May 1948 (age 78) Bera, Pabna, East Bengal, Pakistan (now Bangladesh)
- Party: Awami League
- Occupation: Politician

Shamsul Hoque Tuku (Bengali: শামসুল হক টুকু; born 31 May 1948) is a Bangladeshi politician from the Awami League party and former deputy speaker of the Jatiya Sangsad. He also served as the minister of home affairs in the second Hasina ministry.

He was also a member of the Jatiya Sangsad from 2008 to 2024 from the constituency of Pabna-1.

Tuku is currently incarcerated on the charges of being involved in and aiding the July massacre and extortion case.

== Early life and education ==
Tuku was born on 31 May 1948. He completed his master's degrees in communication, arts and law.

== Political career ==
Tuku was elected as a member of parliament (MP) from the Pabna-1 constituency in the 2018 parliamentary election. In July 2009, he was appointed state minister for the Ministry of Home Affairs by the cabinet council.

In 2013, his house in Pabna District, rented to the local passport office, was damaged during violence involving members of Bangladesh Jamaat-e-Islami.

Tuku was re-elected as an MP in the 2014 parliamentary election. He has also served on parliamentary standing committees for the Ministry of Home Affairs; Ministry of Law, Justice and Parliamentary Affairs; and Public Accounts. On August 28, 2022, he was selected as the deputy speaker of the Jatiya Sangsad.

== Arrest ==
On 14 August 2024, Tuku, along with former State Minister for Information and Communication Technology Zunaid Ahmed Palak and Dhaka University Chhatra League general secretary Tanvir Hasan Saikat, was arrested in Dhaka's Nikunja residential area and was taken to the Detective Branch (DB) office.

The arrests were linked to the fatal shooting of rickshaw puller Kamal Mia on July 19, 2024, during the quota reform movement in Dhaka's Malibagh area. Following the incident, Kamal Mia's wife, Fatema Khatun, filed a murder case at Paltan Police Station on July 20, naming unidentified individuals.

On August 15, Dhaka Metropolitan Magistrate Rashidul Alam approved a 10-day remand for the accused to facilitate further investigation.

On January 6, 2025, a Pabna court denied Tuku bail in an extortion case, leading to his incarceration.

== Personal life ==
Tuku's brother, Abdul Baten, was the mayor of Bera Municipality. In October 2020, Baten was accused of "misbehaving" with a upazila nirbahi officer in Bera Upazila.
