= Mirza (name) =

Historical royal and noble title

Mirza and Mirzad (man), and Mirzada (woman) (/ˈmɜːrzə/ or /mɪərˈzɑː/; Persian: میرزا, romanized: Mīrzā) (Note: Persian: میرزا; Azerbaijani: Mirzə; Tajik: Мирзо; Uzbek: Mirzo; Russian: Мурза; Bashkir: mïrða; Circassian: Мырзэ (common variance in Tatar nobility as Morza); Urdu: مرزا; Punjabi: مرزا.) is a multi-ethnic name of Persian origin. It is used as a surname or prefix to identify patriarchal lineage. It is derived from the term Mirzada (Persian: میرزادہ, romanized: Mīrzāda, lit. 'born of the lord').

Mirza and Mirzad for men, and Mirzada for women are titles inherited by descendants of their mothers who hold the title Sharifa / Sayyida / Habiba / Lalla and their fathers who are not Sayyid / Sharif / Habib / Moulay / Sidi and do not have a title inherited from their father.

A Mirza can inherit the titles Mirza, Mirzad and Mirzada to subsequent descendants while a Mirzada cannot be inherited to subsequent descendants.

It is a historical royal and noble title, denoting the rank of a prince (mirza or mirzad) or a princess (mirzada), high nobleman, distinguished military commander, or a scholar. Specifically, it was used as a title by (and today signifies patriarchal lineage to) the various Persian Empires, the Nogai Horde, Shirvanshahs and Circassians of the North Caucasus and the Mughals of the Indian subcontinent. It was also a title bestowed upon members of the highest aristocracies in Tatar states, such as the Khanates of Kazan and Astrakhan.

== Etymology ==
=== Mirzadeh ===
The original title Mīrzā or Mirzā is derived from the Persian term Mīrzāda which literally means 'child of the Mīr' or 'child of the ruler'. Mīrzāda in turn consists of the Arabic title Amīr (English: Emir), meaning 'commander' and the Persian suffix -zāda (ـزاده, meaning 'born of' or 'lineage of'). Due to vowel harmony in Turkic languages, the alternative pronunciation Morza (plural Morzalar; derived from Persian) is also used.

== History ==
Mirza first emerged during the 15th century as an appellative term for members of the Timurid dynasty, adopted in deference to their progenitor, the Central Asian conqueror Timur, who used Amir as his principal title. During the early Timurid era, Mirza preceded a prince's given name, therefore adhering to the Persian fashion, though subsequently the Turkish style was adopted, with the title instead being placed after. This was continued by later rulers such as the Aq Qoyunlus, Safavids, Ottomans and Mughals.

Originally restricted to only monarchs and princes, the title eventually spread among other social groups, though only the former could have it placed after their given name. During the 16th century, the Safavids conferred it upon high-ranking viziers such as Mirza Shah Hossein and Mirza Ata-Allah Isfahani. By the Qajar era, the title simply marked a person as a clerk or a literate man of consequence. Writing in 1828, Frederic Shoberl records that "as a prefix to the name, it may be assumed by, or conferred on any person. It is right, however, to observe, that none but well-educated men, or such as follow respectable professions, or hold honourable posts, take the title of Mirza."

== Persian empires ==
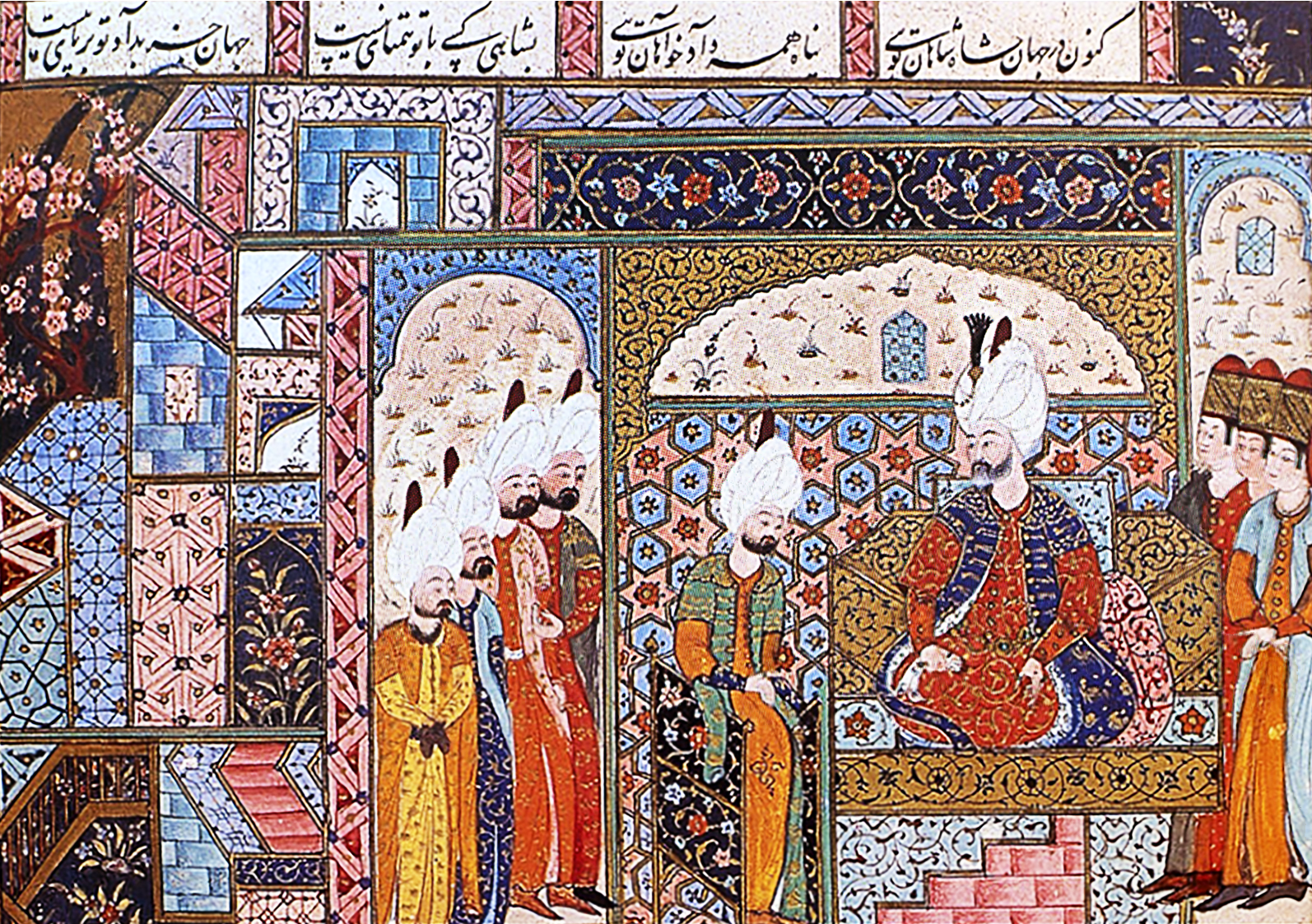
Alqas Mirza meeting Suleiman the Magnificent. Illustration from the Süleymanname.

=== Safavid dynasty ===
- Padeshah Ali Mirza
- Prince Alqas Mirza
- Crown Prince Mohammad Baqer Mirza
- Vizier Mirza Shokrollah Isfahani
- Vizier Mirza Salman Jaberi
- Vizier Mirza Shah Hossein

=== Afsharid dynasty ===
- Prince Reza Qoli Mirza
- Prince Shahrokh Mirza
- Prince Ebrahim Mirza
- Statesman Mirza Mehdi Khan
- Crown Prince Nader Mirza

=== Qajar dynasty ===
- Prince Iraj Mirza
- Prince Malek Mansur Mirza Shoa as-Saltaneh
- Prince Bahram Mirza Sardar Mass'oud
- Crown Prince Abbas Mirza
- Prince Abdol Majid Mirza
- Prince Bahram Mirza
- Prince Jahangir Mirza
- Prince Eskandar Mirza
- Prince Hamid Mirza
- Prince Khanlar Mirza
- Prince Khosrow Mirza
- Prince Muhammad Mirza
- Prince Mahmoud Mirza
- Crown Prince Mohammad Hassan Mirza
- Prince Mohammad Hassan Mirza II
- Prince Ahmad Shah Qajar
- Prince Firuz Mirza
- Prince Firouz Nosrat-ed-Dowleh III
- Prince Ali Mirza Qajar
- Prince Nosrat al-Din Mirza Salar es-Saltaneh
- Prince Abdol-samad Mirza Ezz ed-Dowleh
- Prince Mass'oud Mirza Zell-e Soltan
- Prince Mohammad-Ali Mirza Dowlatshah
- Prince Mohammad Taqi Mirza
- Prince Kamran Mirza Nayeb es-Saltaneh

== Shirvanshahs ==
Three consecutive titular kings of Shirvan, of the Shirvanshah Dynasty (present-day Azerbaijan), adopted the title as well following the death of Qorban Ali Mirza.

- Gasim Mirza
- Kavus Mirza
- Abu Bakr Mirza

== Mughal Empire ==
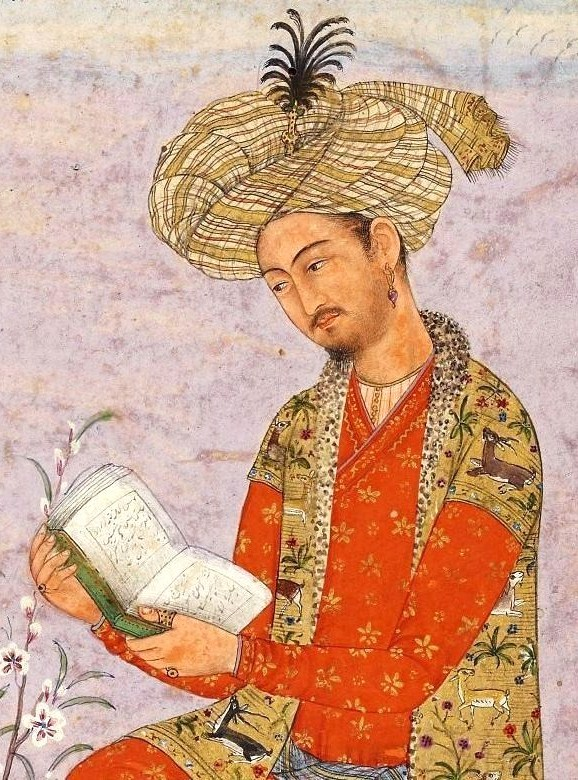
Babur Mirza (born Mirza Zahiruddin), first emperor of Mughal dynasty.

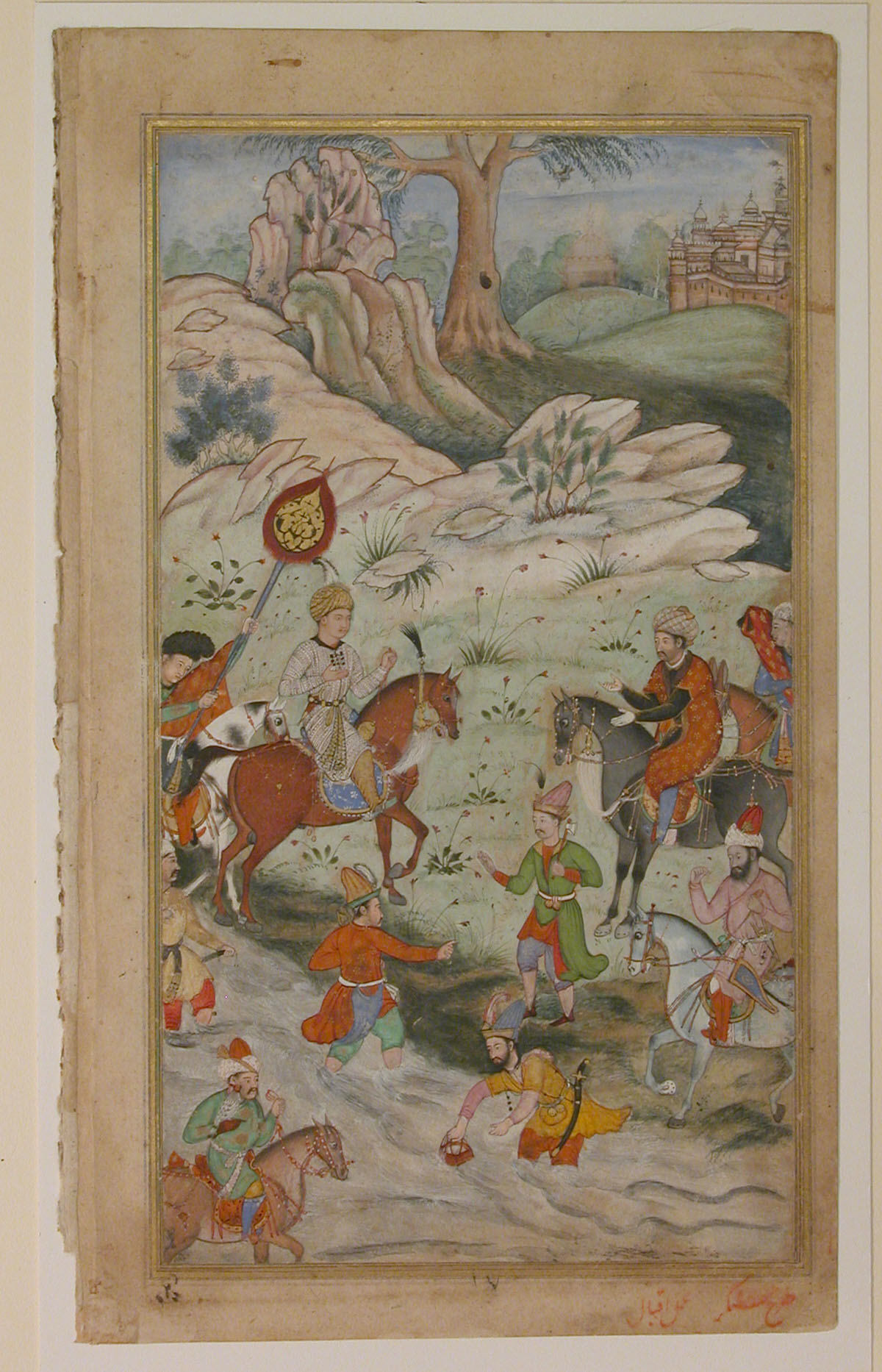
Meeting between Babur Mirza and Soltan-Ali Mirza near Samarqand (The Met Museum of Art NYC / Cleveland Museum of Art).

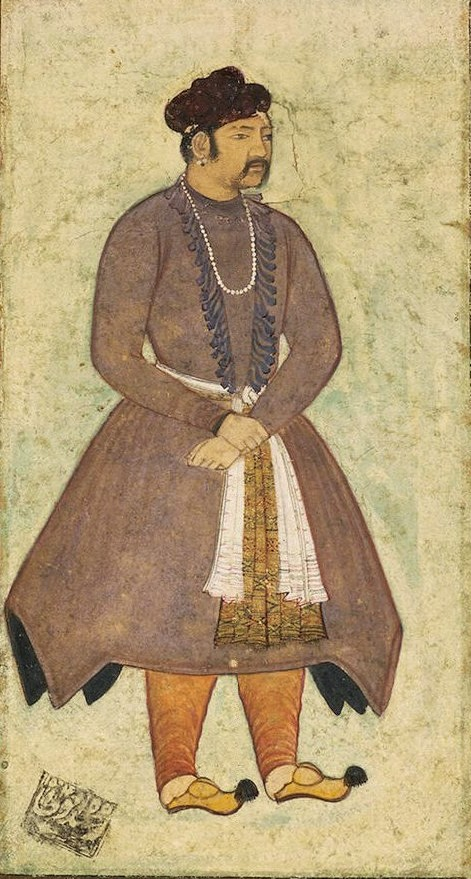
Akbar Mirza (born Mirza Abu'l-Fath Jalal-ud-din Muhammad), one of the most popular Mughal emperors of India, known as "Akbar the Great".

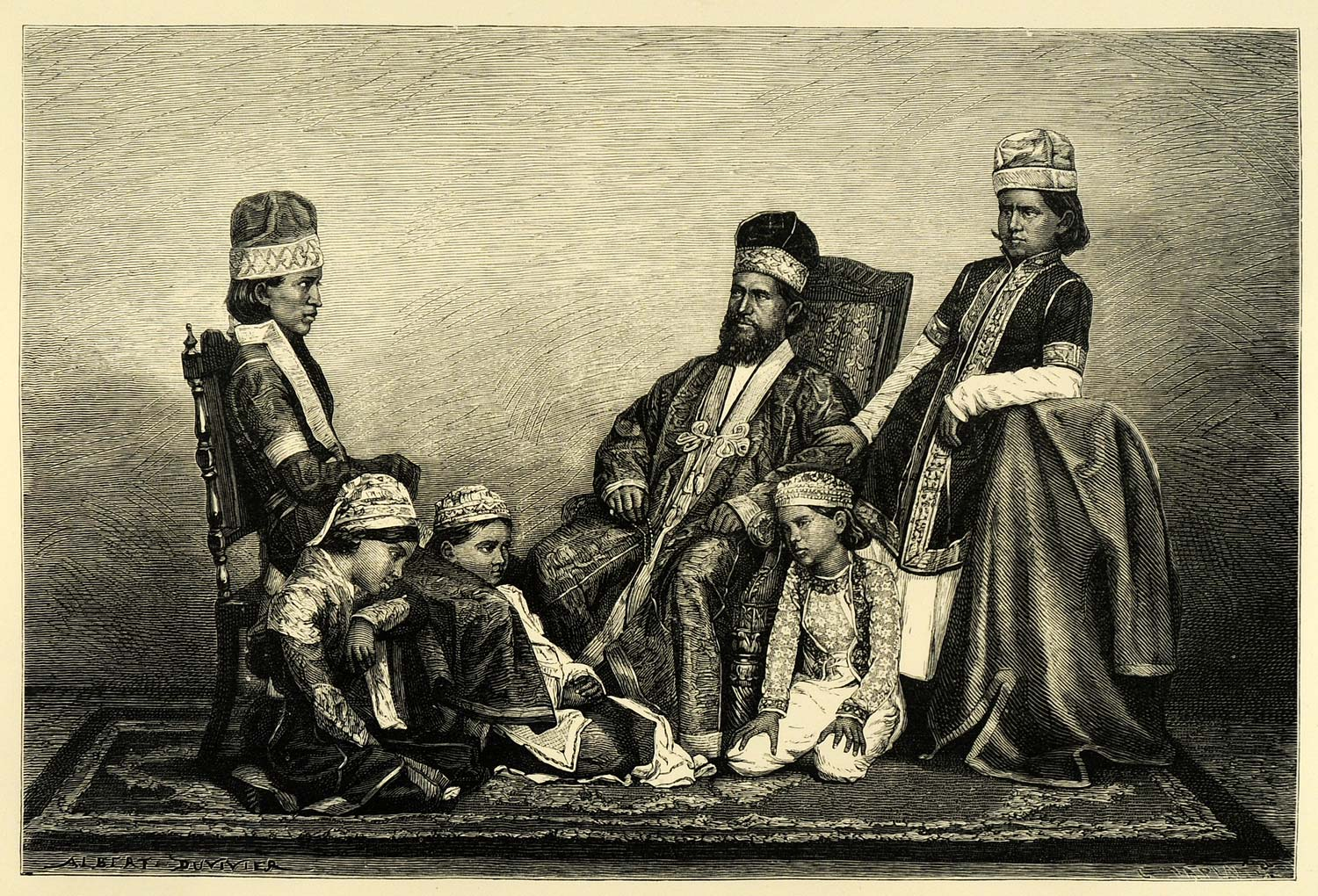
Mirzas of the Mughal imperial family, c. 1878.

The title Mirza was borne by an imperial prince. It was adopted as part of ones name, implying relationship to the Mongol dynasties like the Mughal dynasty (the Imperial House of Timur). In the traditional naming sequence of the Indian royal families, the title can be placed both before the name and after it, such as Prince Mirza Mughal or Prince Kamran Mirza. Prince Khusrau Mirza was the grandson of Emperor Akbar (Akbar Mirza), son of Emperor Jahangir and a brother of Emperor Shah Jahan. Emperor Akbar Shah II was known as Prince Mirza Akbar before his coronation. Emperor Babur took the imperial title of Badshah on 6 March 1508, before which he used the title Mirza.

=== Mughal dynasty ===
- Mirza Zahiruddin 1494–1530, first Mughal Emperor.
- Mirza Nasiruddin 1530–1539 & 1554–1555, second Mughal Emperor.
- Mirza Jalaluddin 1556–1605, third Mughal Emperor.
- Mirza Nuruddin Salim 1605–1627, fourth Mughal Emperor.
- Mirza Salafuddin Shahryar 1627–1628, de facto Ruler
- Mirza Shahabuddin Khurram 1628–1658, fifth Mughal Emperor.
- Mirza Muhiuddin Aurangzeb 1658–1707, sixth Mughal Emperor.
- Mirza Qutbuddin Azam 1707, seventh Mughal Emperor.
- Mirza Mu'azzam 1707–1712, eighth Mughal Emperor.
- Mirza Muizuddin Muhammad 1712–1713, ninth Mughal Emperor.
- Mirza Muinuddin Muhammad 1712–1719, tenth Mughal Emperor.
- Mirza Shamsuddin 1719, eleventh Mughal Emperor.
- Mirza Rafiuddin 1719, twelfth Mughal Emperor.
- Mirza Muhammad Nekusiyar 1719, thirteenth Mughal Emperor.
- Mirza Nasiruddin Roshan Akhtar, fourteenth Mughal Emperor.
- Ahmad Shah Mirza 1720–1748, fifteenth Mughal Emperor.
- Azizuddin Beg Mirza 1754–1759, sixteenth Mughal Emperor.
- Jalaluddin Mirza 1759–1760, seventeenth Mughal Emperor.
- Muhi-ul-Millat Mirza 1788–1806, eighteenth Mughal Emperor.
- Mirza Akbar 1806–1837, nineteenth Mughal Emperor.
- Sirajuddin Mirza 1837–1857, Mughal Emperor.
- Mirza Abdullah, son of Bahadur Shah II 1850–1897, Mughal Emperor.
- Mirza Aziz Koka (1542–1624), foster-brother of Akbar, son of Ataga Khan

=== Imperial families of Central India and Bengal ===
The archaic Bengali form of Mirza was Mridha in Bengal and Bihar.

- Mirza Shuja ud-din Muhammad Khan, second Nawab of Bengal, Bihar and Odisha.
- Mirza Asadullah, third Nawab of Bengal, Bihar and Odisha.
- Mirza Muhammad Ali, fourth Nawab of Bengal, Bihar and Odisha.
- Mirza Mohammad Siraj, fifth Nawab of Bengal, Bihar and Odisha.
- Mirza Hassan Ali Khan Bahadur, 18th Nawab of Bengal, Bihar and Odisha.
- Mirza Wasif Ali Khan, 19th Nawab of Bengal, Bihar and Odisha.
- Mirza Waris Ali Khan, 20th Nawab of Bengal, Bihar and Odisha.

=== Royal family of Awadh ===
- Mirza Muhammad Muqim Ali Khan, second Nawab Subahdar of Awadh (Oudh)
- Mirza Amani Asif-ud-Dawlah, fourth Nawab Subahdar of Awadh
- Mirza Asif Jah Wazir Ali Khan, fifth Nawab Subahdar of Awadh
- Mirza Wajid Ali Shah, eleventh Nawab Subahdar (fifth King) of Awadh

== Rajput dynasty ==
=== Rajputs of Northern India ===
Originally being adversaries and opponents to the Mughal emperors, the title Mirza was also adopted by the Muslim Rajputs of northern India. Many of the Rajput imperial families were descendants of ancient warriors, who strategically formed blood alliances with Mughal aristocracy. The Rajputs were rulers of princely states comprising vast territories of Northern India, including the Punjab, Kashmir and Rajasthan. Inter-marriage between Mughal aristocracy and Rajput aristocracy became very common and various factions of Rajput kingdoms embraced the Islamic faith, giving rise to the term "Muslim Rajputs". Rajput rulers were also granted the title Mirza on account of being high-ranked commanders in the Mughal military. The meaning of Mirza (Persian origin) is identical to the meaning of Rājpūt (राजपूत of Prakrit origin, ultimately from Sanskrit राजपुत्र Rājaputra).

== Other notable people named Mirza ==
=== Sport ===
- Sania Mirza, Indian tennis player, former WTA number 1
- Fadi Merza, Syrian-Austrian middleweight kickboxer, former world champion kickboxing and Muay Thai
- Mirza Ali Baig, Pakistani mountaineer
- Mirza Baig, Pakistani cricketer
- Mirza Bašić, Bosnian tennis player, winner 2018 Sofia Open
- Mirza Begić, Bosnian-Slovenian Olympic basketball player
- Mirza Delibašić, Bosnian basketball player
- Mirza Delimeđac, Bosnian football player
- Mirza Džomba, Croatian handball player
- Mirza Golubica, Bosnian football player
- Mirza Hajdinović, Serbian-Bosniak politician
- Mirza Halvadžić, Bosnian football player
- Mirza Hasanbegović, Bosnian football player
- Mirza Hasanović, Bosnian football player
- Mirza Jelečak, Bosnian football player
- Mirza Kapetanović, Bosnian football player
- Mirza Khan, Pakistani hurdler
- Mirza Mešić, Bosnian football player
- Mirza Muratovic, Australian football player
- Mirza Mustafić, Bosnian football player
- Mirza Sarajlija, Bosnian-Slovenian basketball player
- Mirza Teletović, Bosnian basketball player
- Mirza Varešanović, Bosnian football manager
- Rasul Mirzaev, Russian MMA fighter
- Salman Mirza, Pakistani cricketer

=== Academics and literature ===
- Meerza Delawar Hosaen Ahmed (1840–1913), first Muslim graduate of the British Raj
- Mirza Muhammad Yusuf Ali (1858–1920), Bengali writer and social activist
- Mirza Ali-Akbar Sabir (1862-1911), Azerbaijani satirist and poet
- Heidi Safia Mirza (born 1958), British academic
- Iraj Mirza, Persian folk poet, also known as Jalaal-al-mamalek.
- Mirza Abu Taleb Khan, tax-collector and administrator from northern India, writer of an early travel guide to Europe.
- Mirza Athar Baig is a Pakistani novelist, playwright and short story writer.
- Mirza Gʻafur Gʻulom, Uzbek poet, writer, and literary translator, considered one of the most influential Uzbek writers of the 20th century.
- Mirza Ghalib (born Mirza Asadullah Baig Khan), an Urdu and Persian poet from the Indian subcontinent who adorned the Mughal court.
- Mirza Kalich Beg, Sindhi writer.
- Mirza Khan of "Mirza & Sahiba", a tragic romance story, based on true events, which is enshrined in Punjabi literature and commonly told in Punjab. Mirza of "Mirza & Sahiba" was of Kharal Jat Muslim tribe.
- Muhammad Munawwar Mirza, a prominent scholar, historian, writer and intellectual from Pakistan.
- Nawab Mirza Khan "Daagh Dehlvi", Urdu poet.

=== Arts and entertainment ===
- Aziz Mirza (born 1947), Indian film director, producer and writer.
- Bashir Mirza (also known as BM), a Pakistani painter.
- Hady Mirza (born 1980), Singaporean singer.
- Haroon Mirza, British Pakistani artist born in London.
- Jeff Mirza, British comedian
- Mastan Haider Mirza, Indian mafia boss, mobster and filmmaker; popularly known as the first "celebrity gangster" of Mumbai.
- Mirza Babayev, Azerbaijani movie actor and singer. Honored Artist of the Azerbaijan SSR and People's Artist of Azerbaijan.
- Mirza Kadym Irevani, Azerbaijani artist.
- Mirza Nadeem Baig Mirza Nazeer Baig Mughal (better known by his stage name Nadeem Baig), a Pakistani actor, singer and producer.
- Mirza Šoljanin, Bosnian singer.
- Mohib Mirza is a Pakistani actor and television host.
- Saeed Mirza, Indian film director and screenwriter, considered one of the most influential parallel cinema movie makers in India.
- Shazia Mirza, English comedienne.
- Dia Mirza, Indian actress and former model.
- Mirza Farid Baig, Indian-Canadian hiker.

=== Government ===
- Abdul Latif Mirza, Bangladeshi politician
- Mirza Abdul Jalil, former chairman of Bangladesh Krishi Bank
- Mirza Ghulam Hafiz, Bangladeshi politician and former Speaker of the Jatiya Sangsad
- Mirza Ruhul Amin, Bangladeshi politician
- Mirza Abdul Halim, Bangladeshi politician and former Minister of Shipping
- Mirza Abdur Rashid, Bangladeshi politician
- Mirza Abdul Awal, Bangladeshi politician
- Mirza Azam, Bangladeshi politician and former Minister of Textiles and Jute
- Mirza Muraduzzaman, Bangladeshi politician and former president of Bangladesh Nationalist Party's Sirajganj branch
- Mirza Sultan Raja, Bangladeshi politician and former president of Jatiya Samajtantrik Dal
- Mirza Fakhrul Islam Alamgir, Bangladeshi politician, the incumbent secretary general of the Bangladesh Nationalist Party (BNP) since 2016
- Mirza Abbas, Bangladeshi politician and former Mayor of Dhaka City Corporation from 1991 to 1993
- Fahmida Mirza, first female Speaker of the National Assembly of Pakistan
- Hasnain Mirza, lawyer, barrister and Member of Parliament who was a Member of the Provincial Assembly (MPA)
- Iskandar Ali Mirza, the first President and 4th Governor General of the Islamic Republic of Pakistan in 1956
- Mirza Tofazzal Hossain Mukul, Bangladeshi politician
- Mirza Ali Asghar Khan Amin al-Soltan, the last prime minister of Iran under Naser al-Din Shah Qajar
- Mirza Ismail, Prime Minister, Jaipur (Diwan of Jaipur) (1942–1946)
- Mirza Kuchik Khan, early 20th-century revolutionary, Gilani Nationalist and the president of the Republic Of Gilan
- Mirza Muzaffar Ahmad, a Federal Finance Minister and Finance Secretary, Chairman of Planning Commission of Pakistan Executive director of the World bank
- Mirza Nasrullah Khan, the first Iranian Prime Minister
- Munira Mirza, Deputy Mayor of London and the Director of the Number 10 Policy Unit under UK Prime Minister Boris Johnson
- Syed Kazim Ali Mirza, Indian politician
- Zulfiqar Mirza, Pakistani politician affiliated with the Pakistan Peoples Party (PPP)

=== Judges and advocates ===
- Zafar Hussain Mirza, Pakistani judge and the father of former Home Minister of Sindh Zulfiqar Mirza.

=== Journalists ===
- Janbaz Mirza was a writer, poet, and journalist from Pakistan.
- Tahir Mirza was a senior Pakistani journalist and former editor of Dawn, Pakistan's oldest and most widely circulated English-language newspaper.
- Mehdi Mirzamehdi Tehrani is an Iranian journalist, author and film critic.

=== Military ===
- Mirza Ahmed Beg, one of the original Punjabi soldiers of the famed "Hodson's Horse" regiment of the British Indian Army, pictured in the historical 1858 photograph. He was a descendant of Mirza Hakim Beg, after whom the Indian village Hakimpur in Gurdaspur district is named.
- Sahir Shamshad Mirza, a Pakistani four star-general serving as the 18th Chairman Joint Chiefs of Staff Committee.
- Mirza Aslam Beg, a Former Chief of Army Staff of Pakistan.
- Mirza Baqi, 17th-century Mughal general
- Mirza Ghulam Murtaza was the chieftain of Qadian and a commander with the Sikh Army.
- Mirza Kuchak Khan was a Persian revolutionary who led the Jungle Movement in the northern jungles of Gilan Province.

=== Nobility and royalty ===
- Khan Muhammad Mirza, architect during the Mughal Era.
- Mirza Ali Behrouze Ispahani, Bangladeshi businessman from the Ispahani family and the chairman of M. M. Ispahani Limited.
- Mirza Hadi Baig, Mughal nobleman from Samarkand who was granted 80 villages by Babur.
- Mirza Najaf Khan, Indian courtier and Commander-in-Chief of the Mughal Imperial Army.
- Sikandar Mirza, Armenian courtier within Akbar's Mughal Empire
- Umer Sheikh Mirza, ruler, father of Mughal Prince Mirza Babar

=== Other people ===
- Mirza Ghulam Ahmad, Indian religious leader
- Mirza Mahdi Ashtiani, Iranian philosopher
- Mirza Shirazi, Iranian Shia marja' (1815–1895)
- Mirza Mahdi al-Shirazi, Iranian Shia marja'
- Muhammad Ali Mirza, Pakistani religious scholar

== See also ==
- Murzin
- Rana (title)
- Baig, Bey
- Beg Khan
- Emir
- Mir (title)
- Khanzada
- Begzada
- Morza
- Mughal (tribe)
- Muslim Rajput
- Nawab
- Shahzada
- Sultanzada
- Mirza Ghassemi
- Sayyid
