= Aminpur Thana =

Aminpur আমিনপুর
- Thana
- Located in Bangladesh
- Coordinates: 23°55.2′N 89°37.2′E
- Country: Bangladesh
- Division: Rajshahi Division
- District: Pabna District

Government

Area
  - Total: 227.38 km^{2} (87.79 sq mi)

Population (2014)
  - Total: 295,334
  - Density: 1,298.9/km^{2} (3,364.0/sq mi)
- Time zone: UTC+6 (BST)
- Postal code: 6682

Aminpur Thana (Bengali: আমিনপুর থানা) is a thana of Pabna District.

== Location ==
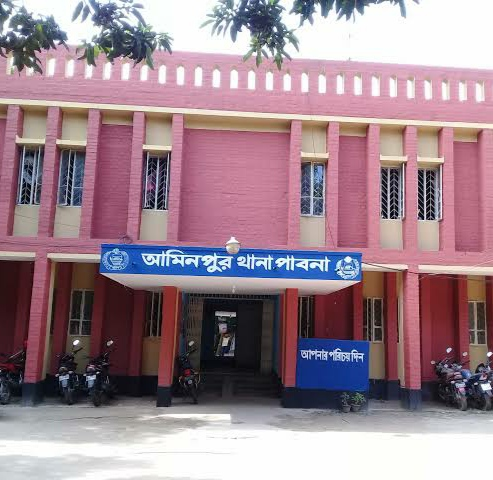
Aminpur Thana, Pabna

The name Aminpur Thana refers to the village of Aminpur, in the Jatsakhni Union of Bera Upazila in the Pabna District of Bangladesh. It is located beside the Attrai River on national highway NH5 between Kazirhat Launch Terminal and Kashinathpur. Aminpur Thana is near Manikgonj and Rajbari. Shibalaya is to the east of Aminpur Thana, Rajbari and Goalanda to the south, Sujanagar to the west, and Bera and Santhia Upazila are to its north.

=== Rivers ===
The Atrai near the River Aminpur has dried up. The Jamuna river is in the east and the Padma river flows to the south and the river plains of Badai.

== History ==
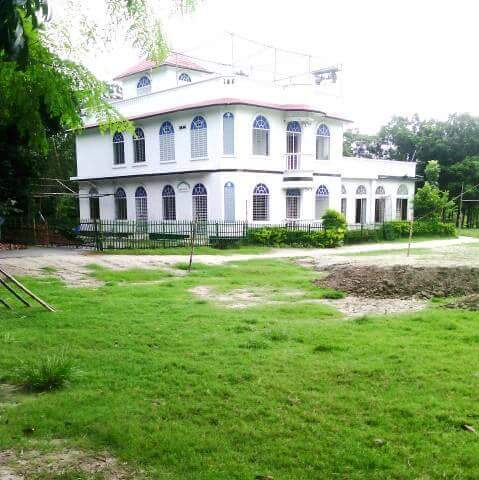
Khas Aminpur (Bengali: খাস আমিনপুর)

Aminpur village was an ancient settlement that developed when a Muslim land surveyor or amin temporarily settled in the area.

In 1995, the Dhalcher area was known as the Turbaned area of Pabna.

In 1997, the regional government created a Police Investigation Center in Aminpur village to help establish control. On 20 October 2013, the retired air vice-marshal Abdul Karem Khandkher inaugurated the Aminpur Police Station as the 11th police station in Aminpur Thana.

== Union council ==
There are eight unions in Aminpur Thana. Five are from Bera and three are from Sujanagar:

1. Jatshakhini Union
2. Ruppur Union
3. Masumdia Union
4. Dhalar char union
5. Puran Bharenga Union
6. Sagorkandi Union
7. Ahammadpur Union
8. Raninagar Union

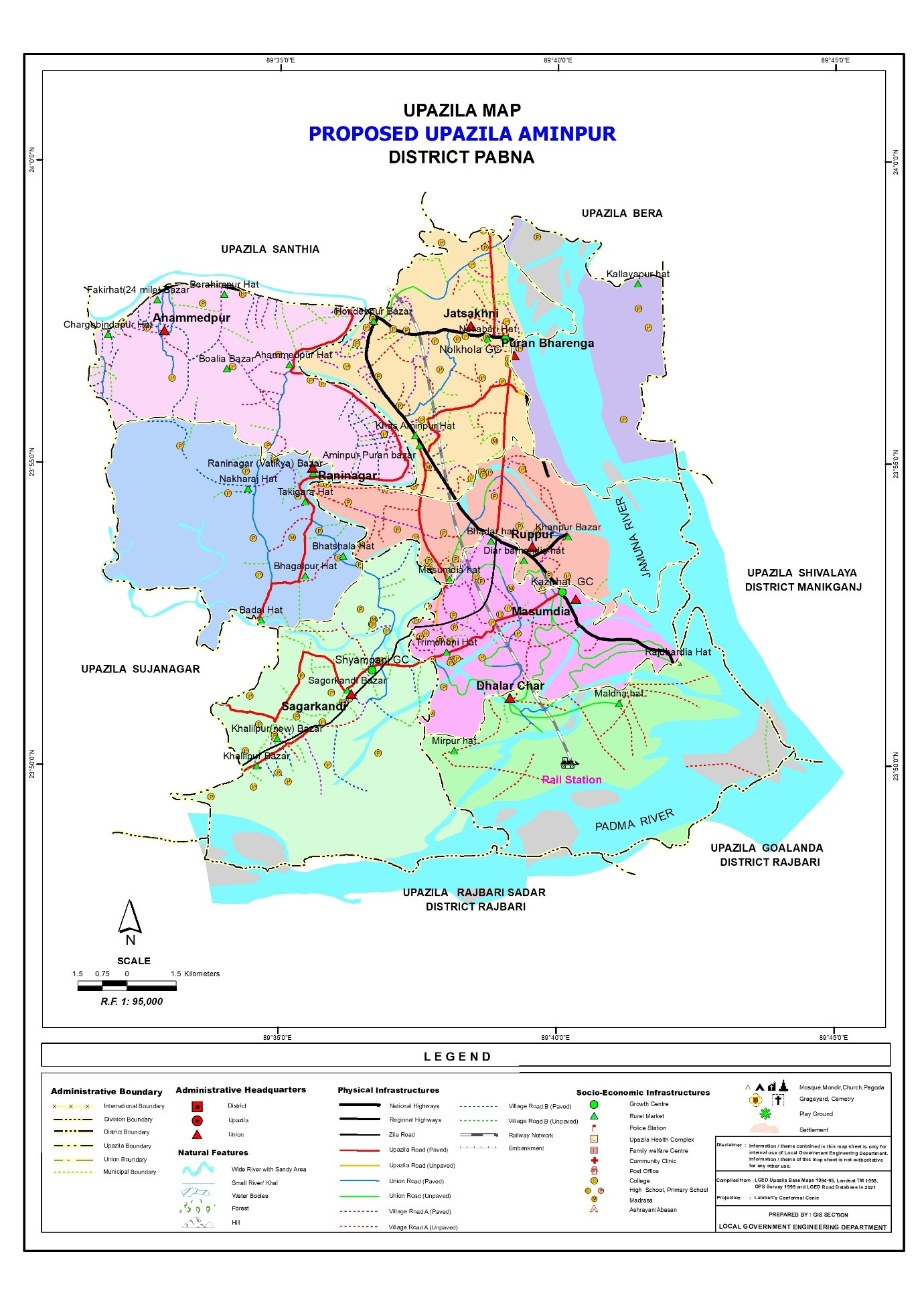
Aminpur Thana Map

== Transportation ==
The distance from Aminpur to Pabna District is 49 km. Rajshahi is 153 km away. The distance between Aminpur to national parliament is 88 km via Aricha Ghat . The distance between Aminpur to Dhaka via Bangabondhu bridge about 200 km.

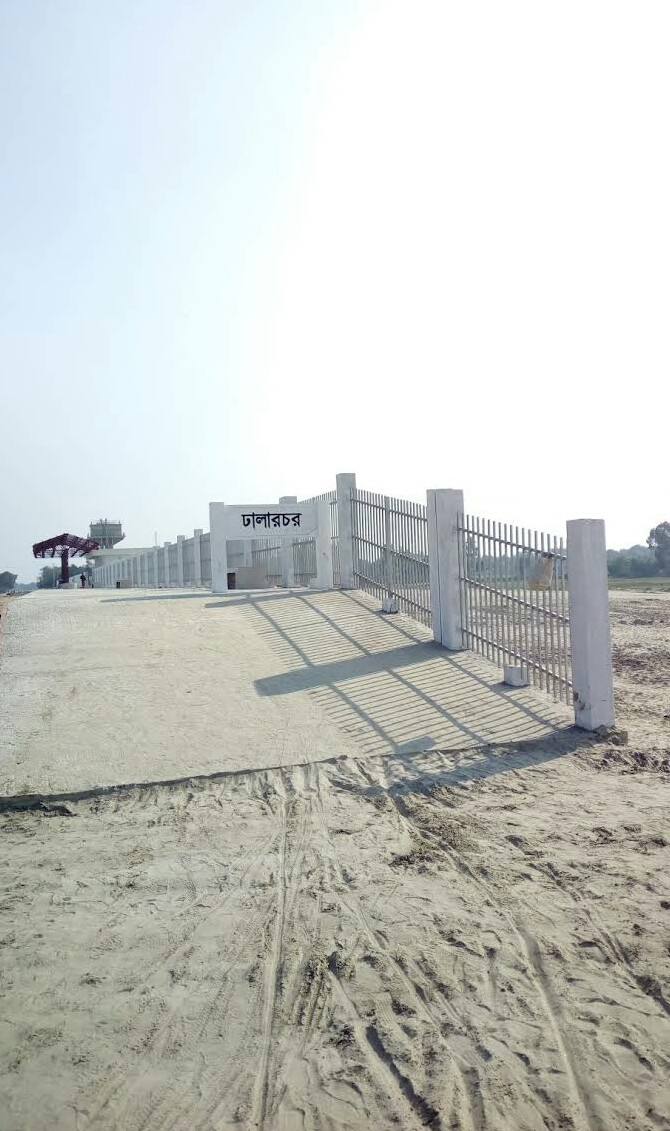
Dhalarchar Railway Station, Aminpur, Pabna (Bengali: ঢালারচর রেল স্টেশন, আমিনপুর, পাবনা।)

The Pabna-Dhalchar rail route goes through Aminpur Police Station. There are two stations: Badaherhat Station (Kadamtala) and Dhalar Char Station.

== Economics ==
60% of the population work in the agricultural sector, 30% in textile industry, and the remaining 10% are employed in other sectors.

== Education ==
Aminpur Thana has an average literacy rate of 62%, of which 35% are males and 27% are females. Aminpur Thana has eight colleges, 23 high schools, 80 primary schools, 20 madrasa, and two vocational schools.

== Healthcare ==
Aminpur police station has one sub-health center. There are eight union health care centers and two community clinics.

Sub-health center:

1. Rajnarayanpur sub-health center

Union Healthcare:

1. Puran Varenga Union Health Center
2. Jatsakhni Union Health Care Center
3. Ruppur Union Health Care Center
4. Mashumudia Union Health Care Center
5. Dhalachar Union Healthcare Center
6. Sagarkandi Union Healthcare Center
7. Raninagar Union Health Care Center
8. Ahmedpur Union Health Care Center

== Notable inhabitants ==
1. AK Khandaker, (Bir Uttam), artist
