= Yenikeyev =

Yenikeyev (Russian: Енике́ев, masculine) or Yenikeyeva (Енике́ева, feminine), also Enikeev, Enikeeva, Yenikeyeff. Also spelled in Tatar: Еникиевләр, romanized: Yenikievlər, is a princely Tatar family, recognized in the Russian Empire. It traces its origins to a famous Tatar general Murza Yenikey Tenishevich Kougushev, who lived in the mid-16th century in Kazan, and was also a warlord in 1668 in Temnikov. He reigned after the death of his father, Prince Tenish, in 1539. Yenikey had five sons: Kulunchak (his branch descendants still bear his last name Kulunchakov), Kobyak, Emmamet, Sabbak, and Ishmamet.

The family is one of the Mishars clan (ethnic group).

In 1613 the family was granted with the title of Princely by the first Russian Tzar Michael of Russia, which all family members bear nowadays.

Descendants of the family reside on the territory of Russia, in the Republics of Tatarstan, Mordovia, Bashkortostan, Uzbekistan, Turkmenistan as well as in Great Britain, the United States and Finland.
