= Nazirganj Dolphin Sanctuary =

Dolphin Sanctuary in Bangladesh

- IUCN category VI (protected area with sustainable use of natural resources)
- Location within Bangladesh
- Location: Pabna, Rajshahi, Bangladesh
- Coordinates: 23.824078°N 89.528122°E
- Area: 146 ha (360 acres)
- Established: 1 December 2013

Nazirganj Dolphin Sanctuary (Bengali: নাজিরগঞ্জ শুশুক অভয়ারণ্য) is a wildlife sanctuary located at Sujanagar Upazila, under Pabna District of Bangladesh. It is one of the three river-based dolphin sanctuaries in Padma-Jamuna confluence, the others being the Shilanda-Nagdemra Dolphin Sanctuary and the Nagarbari-Mohanganj Dolphin Sanctuary. The area of the sanctuary is 146 ha (360 acres). Home to the endangered freshwater Ganges river dolphins, it was officially declared as a wildlife sanctuary by the government of Bangladesh on 1 December 2013.

== See also ==
- List of wildlife sanctuaries of Bangladesh
