= Nosrat al-Din Mirza Salar es-Saltaneh =

Iranian prince (1884–1954)

Nosrat al-Din Mirza
- Salar es-Saltaneh
- Young Nosrat al-Din Mirza
- Born: 2 February 1884
- Died: 1954 (aged 69–70); Paris, French Republic
- Dynasty: Qajar
- Father: Naser al-Din Shah Qajar
- Mother: Zinat es-Saltaneh
- Religion: Twelver Shia Islam
- Occupation: Painter

Prince Nosrat al-Din Mirza Salar es-Saltaneh (2 February 1884 – 1954) was a Qajar prince and painter, son of Naser al-Din Shah Qajar and princess Zinat es-Saltaneh grand daughter of Abbas Mirza.

He was the governor of Hamadan for a year during Mozaffar al-Din Shah's reign. Thereafter, he went to France. In 1923, Nosrat al-Din Mirza was a companion to Mohammad Ali Shah when he returned to Iran. For the second time, he went to France in 1926 and lived there until the death of Malakeh Jahan wife of Mohammad Ali Shah in 1945 in St. Clue and then came back to Iran. In Iran he lived in his sister Ezz es-Saltaneh's house.

In 1954, Nosrat al-Din Mirza died in Paris and was buried there. He was a painter and earned a living in Paris by selling his paintings. He was also a great setar player. Salar es-Saltaneh had 3 children, Sultan Hussein Mirza, Sultan Ali Mirza and Sultan Abdullah Mirza. Abdullah Mirza was born in 1912, died in Iran in 1957, and was buried in Zahir-od-dowleh cemetery.
