= Morza =

Tatar title of Persian origin

Morza (plural morzalar; from Persian mirza) is a Princely title in Tatar states, such as Khanate of Kazan, Khanate of Astrakhan and others, and in Russia.

After the fall of Kazan some morzalar joined Russian service. Some morzalar lost their landownerships and became tradesmen. In the Russian Empire morzalar gained equal rights with Russian nobility. After the October Revolution the majority of morzalar emigrated. Today the Assembly of Tatar Morzalar unites the rest of survived morzalar.

== See also ==
- Enikeev
- Mirza
