= Abu Sayeed (politician) =

Bangladeshi politician

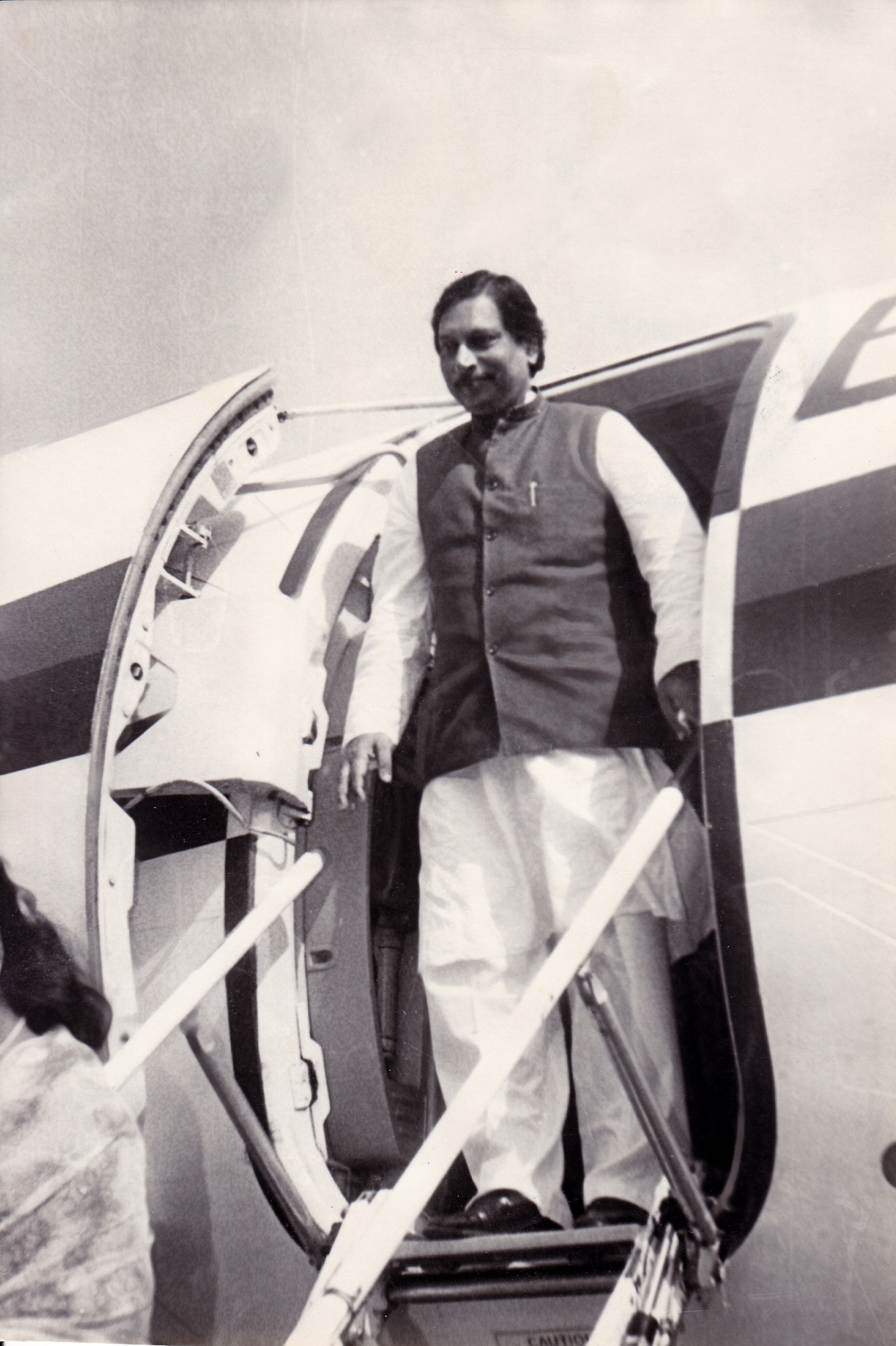
- Sayeed in 1996

State Minister For Information Government of the People's Republic of Bangladesh
- In office 23 June 1996 – 16 July 2001

Jatiya Sangsad member from Pabna-1
- In office 12 June 1996 – 16 July 2001
- Preceded by: Matiur Rahman Nizami
- Succeeded by: Matiur Rahman Nizami

Personal details
- Party: Gano Forum
- Other political affiliations: Awami League; BAKSAL
- Education: Rajshahi University

Abu Sayeed is a politician from Pabna district of Bangladesh, an organizer of the War of Liberation, and a former minister of state for information who was a member of parliament for the then Pabna 8 and Pabna-1 constituencies.

== Career ==
Sayeed was a member of the then Pakistan National Assembly in 1970. He was part of the 34-member committee formed in 1972 to formulate the draft Constitution of Bangladesh. He was designated as the governor of Pabna district by Sheikh Mujibur Rahman in 1975. He has been known for his criticism of the military government.

Sayeed was the state minister of information of Bangladesh from 6 June 1996 until 15 July 2001.

In 2013, Sayeed was conferred a PhD degree by Rajshahi University for his thesis titled "Independence of Bangladesh: Diplomatic War".

In January 2014, Sayeed lost as an independent candidate to Shamsul Haque Tuku in the general election from the Pabna-1 constituency.

In November 2018, Sayeed left the Awami League and joined Gano Forum to contest the upcoming election from Pabna-1 as a candidate of the Jatiya Oikya Front.
