= Bera Upazila =

Bera বেড়া
- Upazila of Bangladesh
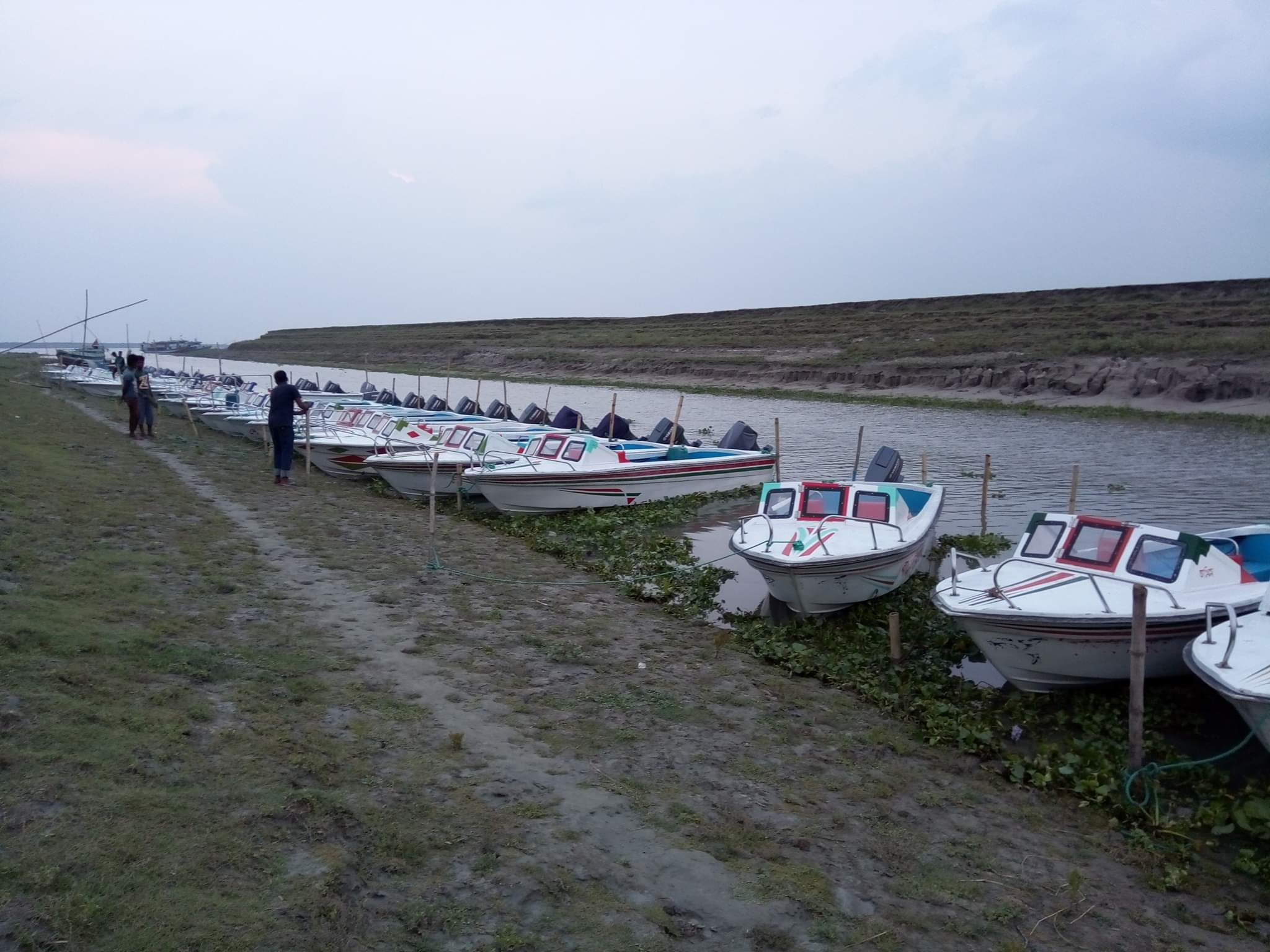
- Boats in Aminpur

- Coordinates: 24°4′N 89°37.5′E
- Country: Bangladesh
- Division: Rajshahi
- District: Pabna

Area
  - Total: 243.43 km^{2} (93.99 sq mi)

Population (2022)
  - Total: 301,494
  - Density: 1,238.5/km^{2} (3,207.8/sq mi)
- Time zone: UTC+6 (BST)
- Postal code: 6680
- Area code: 0731
- Website: Official Map of Bera

Bera Upazila mauza geocode map

Bera (Bengali: বেড়া) is an upazila of Pabna District in the Division of Rajshahi, Bangladesh.

== Geography ==
Bera is located at 24.0667°N 89.6250°E. It has a total area of 243.43 square kilometres (93.99 mi^{2}). It is known as 2nd Adamjee because there is big market for jute and different types of Jute Buildings are available here. It has also many milk-processing factories.

Bera has some small forests where there live some wild animals like foxes, mongooses, different types of wild cats etc. But these forests and animals are going to be vanished because of killing animals and trees.

== Demographics ==
Religions in Bera Upazila (2022)
Religion	Percent
Islam	96.49%
Hinduism	3.51%

According to the 2022 Bangladeshi census, Bera Upazila had 73,059 households and a population of 301,494. 10.17% of the population were under 5 years of age. Bera had a literacy rate (age 7 and over) of 66.86%: 68.83% for males and 64.94% for females, and a sex ratio of 98.31 males for every 100 females. 63,890 (21.19%) lived in urban areas.

According to the 2011 Census of Bangladesh, Bera Upazila had 57,436 households and a population of 256,793. 63,330 (24.66%) were under 10 years of age. Bera had a literacy rate (age 7 and over) of 41.23%, compared to the national average of 51.8%, and a sex ratio of 1000 females per 1000 males. 50,068 (19.50%) lived in urban areas.

As of the 1991 Bangladesh census, Bera has a population of 208,897. Males constitute 52.11% of the population, and females 47.89%. This Upazila's 18-up population is 100,253. Bera has an average literacy rate of 24.1% (7+ years), and the national average of 32.4% literate.

== Administration ==
Bera Upazila is divided into Bera Municipality and nine union councils. The union councils are subdivided into 163 mauzas and 162 villages. The administrative activities of these unions are divided between two police stations (thanas): Bera Model Thana and Aminpur Thana.

5 union councils under Aminpur Thana

- Puran Varenga
- Jatshakhni
- Ruppur
- Masundia
- Dhalar Char

Bera Municipality and 4 unions councils under Bera Model Thana

- Haturia Nakalia
- Kytola
- Chakla
- Nutan Varenga

Bera Municipality is subdivided into 9 wards and 26 mahallas.

Chairman: Muhammad Abdul Kader

Vice Chairman: Md. Mijbah Mollah

Woman Vice Chairman: Most. Asma Khatun

Upazila Nirbahi Officer (UNO): Ashif Anam Siddique

== Notable people ==
- Mirza Abdul Awal, former Member of Parliament
- Mirza Abdul Halim (1927–2021), former Minister of Shipping
- Mirza Abdul Jalil (born 1937), former president of Bangladesh Krishak League
- Osman Ghani Khan (1923–2000), former minister and politician
- Abdul Karim Khandker (born 1930), first Chief of Air Staff and former Planning Minister
- Abu Sayeed (born 1943), former Minister of Information
- Mohit Moitra (died 1933), revolutionary

== See also ==
- Upazilas of Bangladesh
- Districts of Bangladesh
- Divisions of Bangladesh
