= Bangladesh Krishak League =

Farmers wing of Awami League

- Formation: April 19, 1972; 54 years ago
- Dissolved: 10 May 2025 (Banned)
- Region served: Bangladesh
- Official language: Bengali
- President: Samir Chandra Chanda
- General Secretary: Umme Kulsum Smriti
- Parent organization: Bangladesh Awami League

The Bangladesh Krishak League (Bengali: বাংলাদেশ কৃষক লীগ) is a farmers' organization in Bangladesh. Its mother party is the Bangladesh Awami League. It was established on April 19, 1972, with the aim of representing farmers, advocating for their rights, and supporting agricultural development.

== History ==
The Bangladesh Krishak League was established on 19 April 1972 by President Sheikh Mujibur Rahman. Krishak League joined the national unity government, BAKSAL, formed by President Sheikh Mujibur Rahman. On 15 March 1995 during the Bangladesh Nationalist Party tenure, Bangladesh Police killed farmers when they fired on protesting farmers. The event is commemorated as the Krishak Killing Day by the Krishak League. Rashed Mosharraf, president of the Krishak League, served as the minister of land in the first Sheikh Hasina cabinet.

In 2009, Prime Minister Sheikh Hasina started the Tree Plantation Programme 1416 of the government and gave the implementation of the project to Krishak League. Tofazzal Hossain, president of 7th Ward unit of Krishak League in Pabna, was killed by criminals on 3 October 2010. On 17 July 2018, seven individuals were sentenced to life imprisonment by a Pabna court. On 16 August 2016, the secretary of Mollikpur union unit of the Bangladesh Krishak League, Nur Islam Mridha, was killed by individuals associated with Thakur group.

Juned Ahmed, assistant publicity secretary of Sunamganj District unit of Krishak League was killed by criminals on 2 September 2017. On 14 January 2014, Badiuzzaman Badsha, vice-president of Krishak League was expelled for contesting the 10th Bangladesh general election as an independent candidate from Sherpur-2 against Matia Chowdhury. He lost the election to Matia Chowdhury who was the Bangladesh Awami League candidate. Farroque Alam Sarker, vice president of the Krishak League joined Bangladesh Nationalist Party on 14 November 2018 before the 11th general election of Bangladesh.

On 12 May 2025, The government of Bangladesh banned all activities of the Awami League and its affiliated organisations under the Anti-Terrorism Act.
