= Manzur Quader =

Bangladeshi politician and retired major

Minister of State for Water Development
- In office 1986–1990

Member of Parliament
- In office 2001–2008
- Constituency: Sirajganj-6
- In office 15 February 1996 – 12 June 1996
- Constituency: Pabna-1
- In office 1986–1990
- Constituency: Pabna-1

Personal details
- Party: National Citizen Party (2025–present)
- Other political affiliations: Jatiya Party (E) (1986–1996); Bangladesh Nationalist Party (1996–2025)

Military service
- Allegiance: Bangladesh; Pakistan (before 1972)
- Branch: Bangladesh Army; Pakistan Army
- Service years: 1967–1985
- Rank: Major
- Unit: Corps of Engineers
- Conflict: Chittagong Hill Tracts conflict

Manzur Quader is a Bangladeshi politician, retired major of the Bangladesh Army, former minister of state. and former member of parliament for Pabna-1 and Sirajganj-6.

== Career ==
Quader was elected to parliament from Pabna-1 as a Jatiya Party candidate in 1986 and 1988. During his first parliamentary term, he served as the minister of state for water development (3 March 1986 – 4 December 1990). He lost re-election in the 1991 Bangladeshi general election.

He was re-elected to parliament from Pabna-1 as a Bangladesh Nationalist Party (BNP) candidate in the February 1996 Bangladeshi general election; however. he was defeated again a few months later in the June 1996 election.

He was elected to a third term in parliament from Sirajganj-6 as a BNP candidate in the 2001 Bangladeshi general election.

In June 2008, Quader was accused by the Bangladesh Anti-Corruption Commission of non-distribution of 934 pieces of CI sheet which were meant for distribution among the distressed people under the government relief programs. He was accused alongside 11 others in Sirajganj court. He lost re-election later that year in the 2008 Bangladeshi general election.

In December 2025, he joined the National Citizen Party (NCP) after being rejected for the BNP nomination from Sirajganj-5 for the 2026 general election, and was given nomination from the same constituency from the NCP.
