= Santhia Upazila =

Santhia সাঁথিয়া
- Upazila of Bangladesh
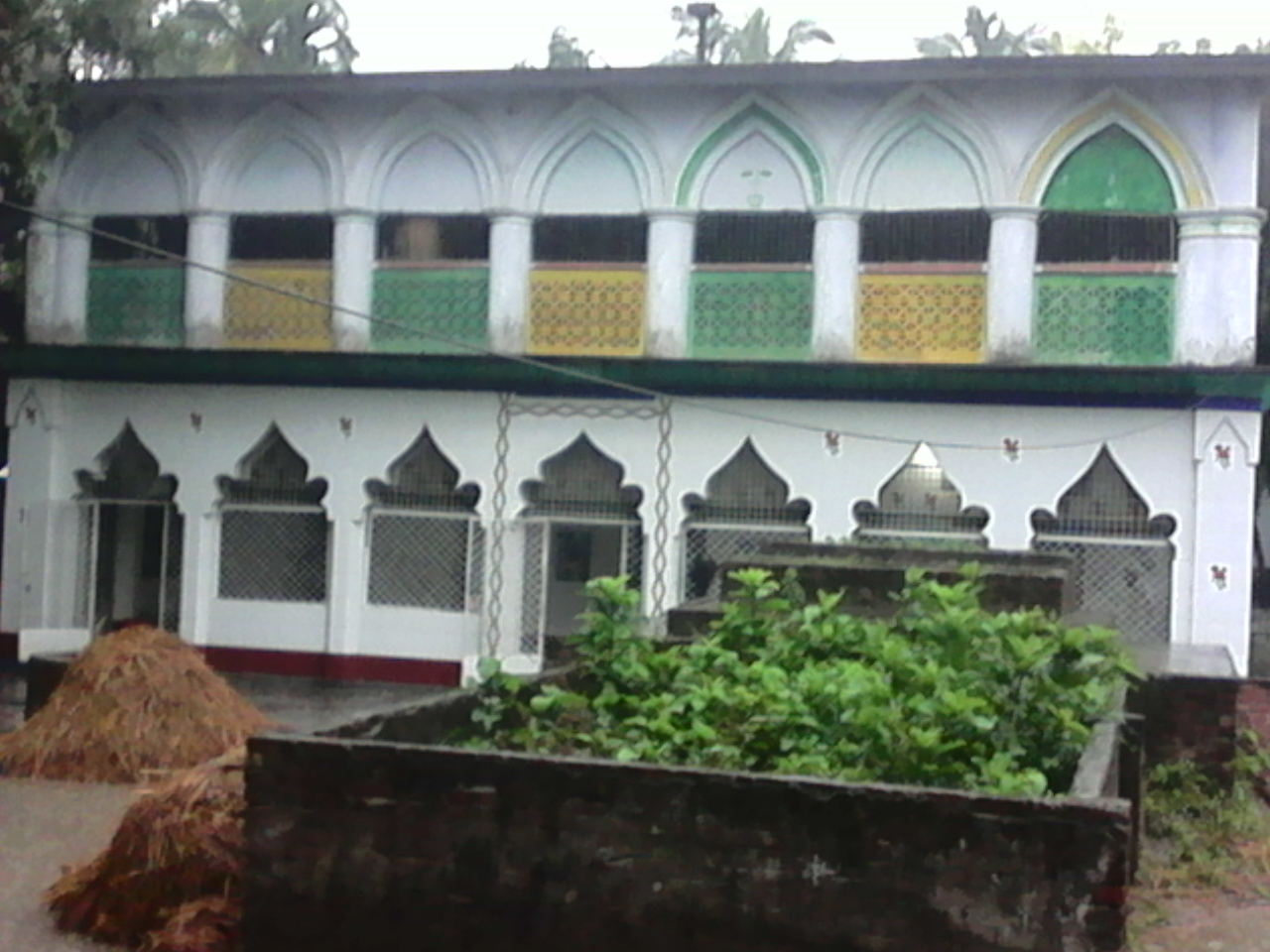
- Nagdemra Jame Masjid

- Coordinates: 24°3.5′N 89°32′E
- Country: Bangladesh
- Division: Rajshahi
- District: Pabna

Government
  - UNO: Riju Tamanna

Area
  - Total: 331.55 km^{2} (128.01 sq mi)

Population (2022)
  - Total: 410,767
  - Density: 1,238.9/km^{2} (3,208.8/sq mi)
- Time zone: UTC+6 (BST)
- Postal code: 6670
- Area code: 07327
- Website: Official Map of Santhia

Santhia Upazila mauza geocode map

Santhia (Bengali: সাঁথিয়া) is an upazila of Pabna District in the Division of Rajshahi, Bangladesh.

== Geography ==
Santhia is located at 24.0583°N 89.5333°E. It has 89,032 households and a total area of 331.55 km^{2}. Santhia has some forest-like areas with wild animals like foxes, mongooses, wild cats, etc. But these woods and animals are on the verge of extinction because of hunting and slash-and-burn.

== Demographics ==
Religions in Santhia Upazila (2022)
Religion	Percent
Islam	97.69%
Hinduism	2.29%
Other or not stated	0.02%

According to the 2022 Bangladeshi census, Santhia Upazila had 105,951 households and a population of 410,767. 9.20% of the population were under 5 years of age. Santhia had a literacy rate (age 7 and over) of 67.37%: 68.23% for males and 66.53% for females, and a sex ratio of 98.57 males for every 100 females. 59,897 (14.58%) lived in urban areas.

According to the 2011 Census of Bangladesh, Santhia Upazila had 89,032 households and a population of 380,301. 88,808 (23.35%) were under 10 years of age. Santhia had a literacy rate (age 7 and over) of 43.88%, compared to the national average of 51.8%, and a sex ratio of 989 females per 1000 males. 38,704 (10.18%) lived in urban areas.

As of the 1991 Bangladesh census, Santhia has a population of 283,463. Males constitute 52.2% of the population, and females 47.8%. This Upazila's eighteen up population is 135,476.

== Administration ==
Santhia Upazila is divided into Santhia Municipality and ten union parishads: Ataikola, Bhulbaria, Dhopadaha, Dhulauri, Gourigram, Karanja, Kashinathpur, Khatupara, Nagdemra, and Nandanpur. The union parishads are subdivided into 176 mauzas and 234 villages.

Santhia Municipality is subdivided into 9 wards and 27 mahallas.

Chairman: 01. Abdullah Al Mahmud Deloar

Vice Chairman: 01.Md Khokon

Woman Vice Chairman: 01. Selima Rahman Shila

Upazila Nirbahi Officer (UNO): Rizu Tamanna

Municipality:

Chairman: Mahbubul Alam Bacchu

Councillors: Md. Abdul Awoal Md. Saiful Alam Md. Shirajul Islam Md. Daud

== See also ==
- Upazilas of Bangladesh
- Districts of Bangladesh
- Divisions of Bangladesh
