= List of Bangladesh–India transboundary rivers =

A transboundary river is a type of river that crosses the political borders of at least one or more countries. There are currently about 260 transboundary rivers in the world. The number of transboundary rivers in Bangladesh is about 57.

== Bangladesh-India transboundary rivers ==
The number of transboundary or joint rivers between India and Bangladesh is officially 54. But a 2023 study by Riverine People, a voluntary organization on rivers, wetlands and water resources, found 69 more unrecognized joint or transboundary rivers.

Out of 54 officially recognised rivers, six rivers: Betna-Kodalia, Atrai, Punarbhaba, Tetulia, Tangon, Kulik or Kokil rivers Enters India from Bangladesh and amongst them three river: Betna - Kodalia, Atrai, Punarbhaba rivers Enters India from Bangladesh and then again re-enters Bangladesh. Remaining 48 or 47 ( origin of Feni River is disputed) rivers Enters Bangladesh from India and amongst them two rivers Nagar and Dahuk river cross from India to Bangladesh and re-enters India and only Mahananda river flows from India to Bangladesh and then goes through India and then again re-enters Bangladesh.

== Joint River Commission ==
The Joint River Commission was a bilateral working group established by India and Bangladesh in the Indo-Bangla Treaty of Friendship, Cooperation and Peace that was signed on 19 March 1972, and came into being in November 1972. As per the treaty, the two nations established the commission to work for the common interests and sharing of water resources, irrigation, floods, and cyclones control. The studies and reports of the commission contributed directly to the efforts of both nations to resolve the dispute over the Sharing of Ganges Waters, facilitating bilateral agreements in 1975, 1978, and finally in 1996.

== List of Bangladesh-India transboundary rivers ==
Legend

⠀Originating in Bangladesh / → ⠀Enters Bangladesh from India / ⠀River mouth in Bangladesh
⠀Originating in India / → ⠀Enters India from Bangladesh / ⠀River mouth in India
⠀Originating in China

List of Bangladesh–India transboundary rivers
River name	Origin	Basin	Bangladesh/India Entry Point	River mouth	Length in India (km)	Length in Bangladesh (km)	Total Length (km)	Length along border (km)	Average width (m)
Raimangal	Ichamati River in Hasnabad, North 24 Parganas district, West Bengal, India	Ganges Basin	Shyamnagar Upazila of Satkhira District, Bangladesh	Bay of Bengal	15	62	77	44 (Note: Of the 54 inter-border rivers flowing between Bangladesh and India, about 140 km of the Ichamati-Kalindi-Raimangal River, about 30 km of the Kushiyara River, about 2 km of the Muhuri River and about 10 km of the Satkhira Sonai River (which is not identified as a transboundary river between the two countries) have not been permanently demarcated, and in other transboundary rivers the international boundary has already been permanently demarcated, even if it is along the midstream of the river or along the banks of any country. is said to have been done.)	2265
Ichamati (Ichhamati) - Kalindi	Mathabhanga River near Majhdia in Nadia District of West Bengal, India	Ganges Basin	Maheshpur Upazila of Jhenaidah District, Bangladesh	Raimangal River, Satkhira District, Bangladesh			345	145	370
Betna - Kodalia	Bhairab River in Jhenaidah District of Bangladesh	Ganges Basin	Enters India through Bagdah, North 24 Parganas district of West Bengal, India Entering Bangladesh through Sharsha Upazila of Jessore District, Bangladesh	Kholpetua River, Satkhira District, Bangladesh	19	191	210	1	55
Bhairab - Kapotaksha	Mathabhanga River in West Bengal, India	Ganges Basin	Kathuli of Sadar Upazila of Meherpur District of Bangladesh	Sibsa River, Khulna, Bangladesh	2	293	295	8	45
Mathabhanga	River Ganges near Jalangi in Murshidabad District of West Bengal, India	Ganges Basin	Daulatpur Upazila of Kushtia District of Bangladesh	Ichamati River, Hawli Union of Damurhuda Upazila of Chuadanga District, Bangladesh	40	144	184	21	29
Ganges / Padma	Gangotri Glacier in the Himalayas in Uttarkashi District, Uttarakhand, India	Ganges Basin	Durlabpur Union of Shibganj Upazila of Chapainawabganj District, Bangladesh	Brahmaputra River, Goalanda Upazila, Chandpur District, Bangladesh	2295	230	2525	83	5000
Pagla	River Ganges in the southwest of Maldah District of West Bengal, India	Ganges Basin	Shibganj Upazila of Chapainawabganj District, Bangladesh	Mahananda River, Sundarpur Union of Chapainawabganj District, Bangladesh	47	36	83	4	170
Atrai	Karatoya River in Khansama Upazila of Dinajpur District, Bangladesh	Brahmaputra Basin	Entering India through Khansama Upazila of Dinajpur District, Bangladesh Enters Bangladesh through Dhamoirhat Upazila of Naogaon District, Bangladesh	Hurasagar River, Baghabari, Sirajganj District, Bangladesh	48	218	266	8	177
Punarbhaba	Wetlands of Baliadangi Upazila, Thakurgaon District, Bangladesh	Ganges Basin	Entering India through Biral Upazila of Dinajpur District, Bangladesh Entering Bangladesh through Sapahar Upazila of Naogaon District, Bangladesh	Mahananda River, Chapainawabganj District, Bangladesh	67	150	217	14	102
Tetulia (Tetulia)	Wetlands of Bochaganj - Atgaon, Dinajpur District, Bangladesh, Bangladesh	Ganges Basin	Entering India through Biral Upazila of Dinajpur District of Bangladesh	Tangon River, North Dinajpur District of West Bengal, India	20	45	65	2	30
Tangon	Wetlands of Magura Union, Panchagarh District, Bangladesh	Ganges Basin	Entering India through Pirganj Upazila of Thakurgaon District of Bangladesh	Mahananda River, southeast of Hilsa Bazar in Maldah District, West Bengal, India	130	123	253	0.3	120
Kulik (Kokil)	Lower area of Raipur in Baliadangi Upazila of Thakurgaon District, Bangladesh	Ganges Basin	Enters India through Haripur Upazila or Bhaturia Union of Thakurgaon District, Bangladesh	Nagar River, Maldah District of West Bengal, India	66	62	128	7	60
Nagar (Nagar Upper)	Hilly area of North Dinajpur District of West Bengal, India	Ganges Basin	Entering Bangladesh through Atwari Upazila of Panchagarh District of Bangladesh Entering India through Haripur Upazila of Thakurgaon District, Bangladesh	Mahananda River, Maldah District, West Bengal, India	55	130	185	92	110
Mahananda	Darjeeling district of the Indian state of West Bengal in the Himalayas	Ganges Basin	Entering Bangladesh through Tetulia Upazila of Panchagarh District of Bangladesh Enters India through North Dinajpur District of West Bengal, India Entering Bangladesh in Bholahat Upazila of Chapainawabganj District, Bangladesh	Ganges River, Godagari Ghat, Rajshahi District Bangladesh	324	36	360	20	460
Dahuk	Wetlands south-west of Jugivhita in Jalpaiguri District, West Bengal, India	Ganges Basin	Tetulia Upazila of Panchagarh District of Bangladesh Enters India through North Dinajpur District of West Bengal, India	Mahananda River, Kishanganj District, Bihar, India	103	12	115	-	80
Karatoya (Korotoa)	Baikunthapur in the northwest of Jalpaiguri District in West Bengal, India	Brahmaputra Basin	Bhajanpur Union of Tetulia Upazila of Panchagarh District of Bangladesh	Atrai River, Dinajpur District, Bangladesh	75	165	241	1	135
Talma	Baikunthapur in the northwest of Jalpaiguri District in West Bengal, India	Brahmaputra Basin	Sadar Upazila of Panchagarh District of Bangladesh	Karatoya River, Panchagarh District, Bangladesh	43	28	71	3	60
Ghoramara	Hilly area of Jalpaiguri district of West Bengal, India	Brahmaputra Basin	Chaklahat Union of Sadar Upazila of Panchagarh District, Bangladesh	Karatoya River, Panchagarh District, Bangladesh	43	23	66	-	65
Deonai / Choralkata / Jamuneshwari	Lower reaches of Jalpaiguri District of West Bengal, India	Brahmaputra Basin	Domar Upazila of Nilphamari District of Bangladesh	Bangali River, Bogra District, Bangladesh	2	365	367	-	50
Buri Teesta	Lower reaches of Jalpaiguri District of West Bengal, India	Brahmaputra Basin	Dimla Upazila of Nilphamari District of Bangladesh	Teesta River, Jaldhaka Upazila of Nilphamari District, Bangladesh	9	67	76	3	69
Teesta	At Tso Lhamo Lake, Zemu Glacier, Sikkim, Himalayas India	Brahmaputra Basin	Dimla Upazila of Nilphamari District of Bangladesh	Brahmaputra River, Phulchhari Upazila of Rangpur District, Bangladesh	249	117	366	3	3000
Dharla	From South Sikkim, India	Brahmaputra Basin	Patgram Upazila of Lalmonirhat District of Bangladesh	Brahmaputra River, Ulipur Upazila of Kurigram District, Bangladesh	173	57	250 (Bhutan 20)	1	1200
Dudhkumar	From the Chumbi Valley of Tibet, China	Brahmaputra Basin	Bhurungamari Upazila of Kurigram District, Bangladesh	Brahmaputra River, Nageshwari Upazila of Kurigram District, Bangladesh	108	46	298 (Bhutan 113, China 31)	3	460
Brahmaputra	Mount Kailash in Tibet, China	Brahmaputra Basin	Nageshwari Upazila of Kurigram District, Bangladesh	Ganges River, Goalanda Upazila of Chandpur District, Bangladesh	918	337	2880 (China 1625)	-	12000
Jinjiram	Urpad Bill of Goalpara District of Assam, India	Meghna Basin	Raomari Upazila of Kurigram District of Bangladesh	Old Brahmaputra River, Bahadurabad, Jamalpur District, Bangladesh	20	135	155	-	107
Chellakhali / Chillakhali / Chitalkhali	West Garo Hills of Meghalaya, India	Meghna Basin	Nalitabari Upazila of Sherpur District, Bangladesh	Maliji River, Balughata in Nalitabari Upazila of Sherpur District, Bangladesh	32	24	56	-	52
Bhogai	South Garo Hills of Meghalaya, India	Meghna Basin	Nalitabari Upazila of Sherpur District, Bangladesh	Baulai River, Sunamganj District, Bangladesh	55	122	177	3	95
Nitai	West Garo Hills of Meghalaya, India	Meghna Basin	Dhobaura Upazila of Mymensingh District, Bangladesh	Bhogai-Kangsha River, Durgapur Upazila, Netrakona District, Bangladesh	56	37	93	1	74
Someshwari (Simsang / Singsang chi / Simsang wari)	East Garo Hills of Meghalaya, India	Meghna Basin	Durgapur Upazila of Netrakona District of Bangladesh	Bhogai- Kangsha River, Purbadhala Upazila of Netrakona District, Bangladesh	104	106	210	1	114
Jadukata / Jodukata / Jadukata-Rokti	West Khasi Hills of Meghalaya, India	Meghna Basin	Tahirpur Upazila of Sunamganj District, Bangladesh	Surma River, Jamalganj, Sunamganj District, Bangladesh	98	34	132	-	57
Damalia / Jalukhali / Cholti	East Garo Hills of Meghalaya, India	Meghna Basin	Bishwamvarpur Upazila of Sunamganj District, Bangladesh	Surma River, Sadar Upazila of Sunamganj District, Bangladesh	67	14	81	-	201
Nawagang / Nauyagang	East Khasi Hills of Meghalaya, India	Meghna Basin	Dowarabazar Upazila of Sunamganj District, Bangladesh	Surma River, Dowarabazar Upazila of Sunamganj District, Bangladesh	11	20	31	-	50
Umiam / Umiyeo	East Khasi Hills of Meghalaya, India	Meghna Basin	Dowarabazar Upazila of Sunamganj District, Bangladesh	Jaliachra (Bholaganj) River, Chhatak Upazila of Sunamganj District, Bangladesh	62	56	118	-	35
Dhala	East Khasi Hills of Meghalaya, India	Meghna Basin	Companiganj Upazila of Sylhet District, Bangladesh	Piyain River, Companiganj Upazila of Sylhet District, Bangladesh	36	12	48	-	158
Piyain	East Khasi Hills of Meghalaya, India	Meghna Basin	Gowainghat Upazila of Sylhet District of Bangladesh	Surma River, Chhatak Upazila of Sunamganj District, Bangladesh	58	44	102	4	115
Shari-Goyain	West Jaintia Hills of Meghalaya, India	Meghna Basin	Jaintiapur Upazila of Sylhet District, Bangladesh	Surma River, Jaintiapur Upazila of Sylhet District, Bangladesh	86	127	213	3	119
Surma	Barak River in Hills of Manipur-Mizoram, India	Meghna Basin	Zakiganj Upazila of Sylhet District, Bangladesh	Upper Meghna River, Kishoreganj District, Bangladesh	460	388	848	26	111
Kushiyara	Barak River in Hills of Manipur-Mizoram, India	Meghna Basin	Zakiganj Upazila of Sylhet District, Bangladesh	Upper Meghna River, Kishoreganj District, Bangladesh	460	281	741	30	268
Sunai / Bardal	Tripura - Mizoram border hill area of India	Meghna Basin	Barlekha Upazila of Moulvibazar District, Bangladesh	Kushiyara River, Fenchuganj Upazila of Sylhet District, Bangladesh	46	168	214	1	81
Juri	Hills of Tripura, India	Meghna Basin	Juri Upazila of Moulvibazar District, Bangladesh	Kushiyara River, Fenchuganj Upazila of Sylhet District, Bangladesh	46	64	110	16	53
Manu	Hills of Tripura, India	Meghna Basin	Kulaura Upazila of Moulvibazar District of Bangladesh	Kushiyara River, Sadar Upazila of Moulvibazar District, Bangladesh	123	77	200	7	111
Dhalai	Hills of Tripura, India	Meghna Basin	Kamalganj Upazila of Moulvibazar District, Bangladesh	Manu River, Rajnagar Upazila of Moulvibazar District, Bangladesh	59	56	115	5	56
Longla	Hills of Tripura, India	Meghna Basin	Sreemangal Upazila of Moulvibazar District of Bangladesh	Bijna-GuaingJuri River, Nabiganj Upazila of Habiganj District, Bangladesh	13	64	77	19	72
Khowai	Hills of eastern Tripura, India	Meghna Basin	Chunarughat Upazila of Habiganj District, Bangladesh	Kushiyara River, Austagram Upazila of Kishoreganj District, Bangladesh	101	57	158	3	106
Sutang	Baramura Mountains of Khowai district, Tripura, India	Meghna Basin	Chunarughat Upazila of Habiganj District, Bangladesh	Kushiyara River, Lakhai Upazila of Habiganj District, Bangladesh	1	76	77	-	36
Sonai	Hills of Tripura, India	Meghna Basin	Madhabpur Upazila of Habiganj District, Bangladesh	Khasturia Canal, Habiganj District, Bangladesh	21	28	49	3	41
Howrah	Baramura Mountains of Khowai district, Tripura, India	Meghna Basin	Akhaura Upazila of Brahmanbaria District of Bangladesh	Titas River, Akhaura Upazila of Brahmanbaria District, Bangladesh	26	14	40	-	40
Bijoni	Baramura Mountains of Sipahijala district, Tripura, India	Meghna Basin	Kasba Upazila of Brahmanbaria District of Bangladesh	Titas River, Akhaura Upazila of Brahmanbaria District, Bangladesh	29	33	62	-	23
Salda	Baramura Mountains of Sipahijala district, Tripura, India	Meghna Basin	Kasba Upazila of Brahmanbaria District of Bangladesh	Buri River, Muradnagar Upazila of Comilla District, Bangladesh	23	60	83	1	37
Gumti / Gomti / Gumati / Gomati	Ranges northeast of Dumboor, Tripura, India	Meghna Basin	Comilla District Sadar Upazila of Bangladesh	Meghna River, Daudkandi Upazila of Comilla District, Bangladesh	177	88	265	1	65
Kakrai-Dakatia	Hilly region of West Tripura, India	Meghna Basin	Ujirpur Union of Chauddagram Upazila of Comilla District, Bangladesh	Lower Meghna River, Lakshmipur District, Bangladesh	12	220	232	1	67
Silonia	Hilly region of South Tripura, India	Meghna Basin	Parshuram Upazila of Feni District of Bangladesh	Feni River, Sadar Upazila of Feni District, Bangladesh	30	40	70	4	62
Muhuri	Dumboor Lake, Lushai Hills, Tripura, India	Meghna Basin	Parshuram Upazila of Feni District of Bangladesh	Feni River, Chhagalnaiya Upazila of Feni District, Bangladesh	53	65	118	2	71
Feni	Tripura, India (Note: The origin of Feni River is disputed) Khagrachhari hill District of Bangladesh	Meghna Basin	Khagrachhari hill District of Bangladesh	Bay of Bengal	94	46	140	94	159

== See also ==
- Transboundary river
- List of rivers of Bangladesh
- List of rivers of West Bengal
- List of rivers of India
