= List of rivers of Tripura =

This is a list of rivers of Tripura, India.

== Major rivers ==
- Deo
- Dhalai
- Feni
- Gomati
- Haora
- Juri River
- Khowai
- Longai River
- Manu River
- Muhuri

== Others ==
- Sumli River

== Sources ==
- "Rivers of Tripura". trpenvis.nic.in. 2007. Archived from the original on 2022-10-14.
- "10 Rivers That Flows In Tripura". travelsbird.com. 2024-02-21. Archived from the original on 2024-12-04.

== See also ==
- Geography of Tripura
- Lists of rivers of India
