= Haora River =

River in Tripura, India

The Haora River is one of the major rivers of the West Tripura District of the Indian state Tripura, located between latitudes 23°37′N and 23°53′N, and longitudinally between 91°15′E and 91°37′E. It is also known by the name Saidra (in Kokborok language) by the indigenous people of the state.

It is one of the ten major rivers flowing in the State of Tripura, the others being: River Longai, Juri, Deo, Manu, Dhalai, Khowai, Bijoy, Gumati, Muhuri and Feny.

== Course ==
The river originates from the western flank of Baramura Hill range, flows in a south-westerly direction and joins the Titas river in Bangladesh. The river is 61.2 km (38.0 mi) long, of which 52 km (32 mi) are within the Indian territory and 9.2 kilometres (5.7 mi) within Bangladesh. The basin area of the river within Tripura is 570 km^{2} (220 sq mi), comprising 5.43% of the total surface area of the state.

== History ==
This river basin was almost uninhabitated before the 1900. After the partition of India and East Pakistan (presently Bangladesh) huge numbers of Hindu immigrants entered into adjacent Tripura and settled down along the Haora River in the Agartala city (capital city). Since then, the dwellers have been using the Haora River for fulfilling their own needs and also for economic benefits. The dwellers, directly or indirectly, have not only been polluting the river water but also contributed in altering the morphology of the river.

Since the beginning of twentieth century, the channel of the main Haora River has been modifying over time. Firstly, by the then king Maharaja Birendra Kishore Manikya, and after that by the Government agencies and local people. To meet the increasing demand of water of the city, Government as well as the local people have been constructing several obstructions:

- Along the river (roads and embankments in some places) and,
- across the river (bridge piers, causeways, sand bag filling for collecting water and so on), for which the river is being compelled to change its natural flow.

Other human activities like, land-use change, sand mining, water collection, solid waste disposal, agriculture, and cutting of tilla land for supplying raw materials to the brick industries have also caused the change of the river course, modifying the natural dynamics of the river.

(Tillas are the low elevated denudational uplands which are bifurcated by narrow dry up channels, called lunga. The elevation variations between tilla and adjacent lunga have been left only a few meters)

== Rainfall and floods ==
Haora River is a rain-fed river, the flow through it is directly related to the amount of rainfall. The annual flow is measured at 36 million cubic metres of water accounting for 4.54% of all river flow in the state (Gumati sitting at top with 31.45%).

All the rivers draining the State originate in the hill ranges and are prone to flood during the rainy season. Whenever the intensity of the rainfall exceeds the normal, the river discharge rises. The volume of water rushing down from the catchment areas cannot be accommodated within the river banks. As a result, the rivers overtop the banks and flood the low-lying areas. Flood level of the Haora river indicates that the danger level is at 10.48 m (34.4 ft), whereas, the extreme danger level is at 10.78 m (35.4 ft). The highest flood level of this river was observed at 11.08 m (36.4 ft) in 2004.
