= Sunampur =

Coordinates: 24.8089°N 92.0701°E

Sunampur is a village located in Golapganj Upazila, Sylhet District, Bangladesh.

The village has 5 mosques, 2 schools, 3 madrasha (Islamic schools), 2 Eid Ghah (Islamic EID prayer place), and 3 cemeteries.

Two rivers flow through the village, Kushiyara River on the north and Radha Jhuri / Khora Nodi on south. Other villages around Sunampur include Chondorpur to the north, Islampur to the west, Ahmedpur to the east and Raihghor to the south.
