= Ghagra Union, Purbadhala =

Coordinates: 25.0266°N 90.5832°E

Ghagra Union (Bengali: ঘাগড়া ইউনিয়ন) is a union parishad under Purbadhala Upazila of Netrokona District in northern Bangladesh.

== Geography ==
Ghagra Union has a total area of 8,938 acres (3,617 ha). It is bounded on the north by the Kangsha River (across which lie Dhobaura and Durgapur upazilas). It borders Jaria Union to the east, Agia Union to the south, and Hugla Union to the west.

== Demographics ==
According to the 2011 Bangladesh census, Ghagra Union had 6,415 households and a population of 29,993. Islam was the majority religion (97% of the population). Hindus were the second-largest religious community (3% of the population). 13.2% of the population was under the age of 5. The literacy rate (age 7 and over) was 41.2%, compared to the national average of 51.8%.

== Education ==
There is one secondary school in the union, Ghagra Bilaterali High School.
