= Narandia Union =

Narandia Union may refer to:

- Narandia Union (Kalihati), a union in Kalihati Upazila
- Narandia Union, Purbadhala, a union in Purbadhala Upazila
