= Surma River =

River in Bangladesh

Surma River Śoraboti
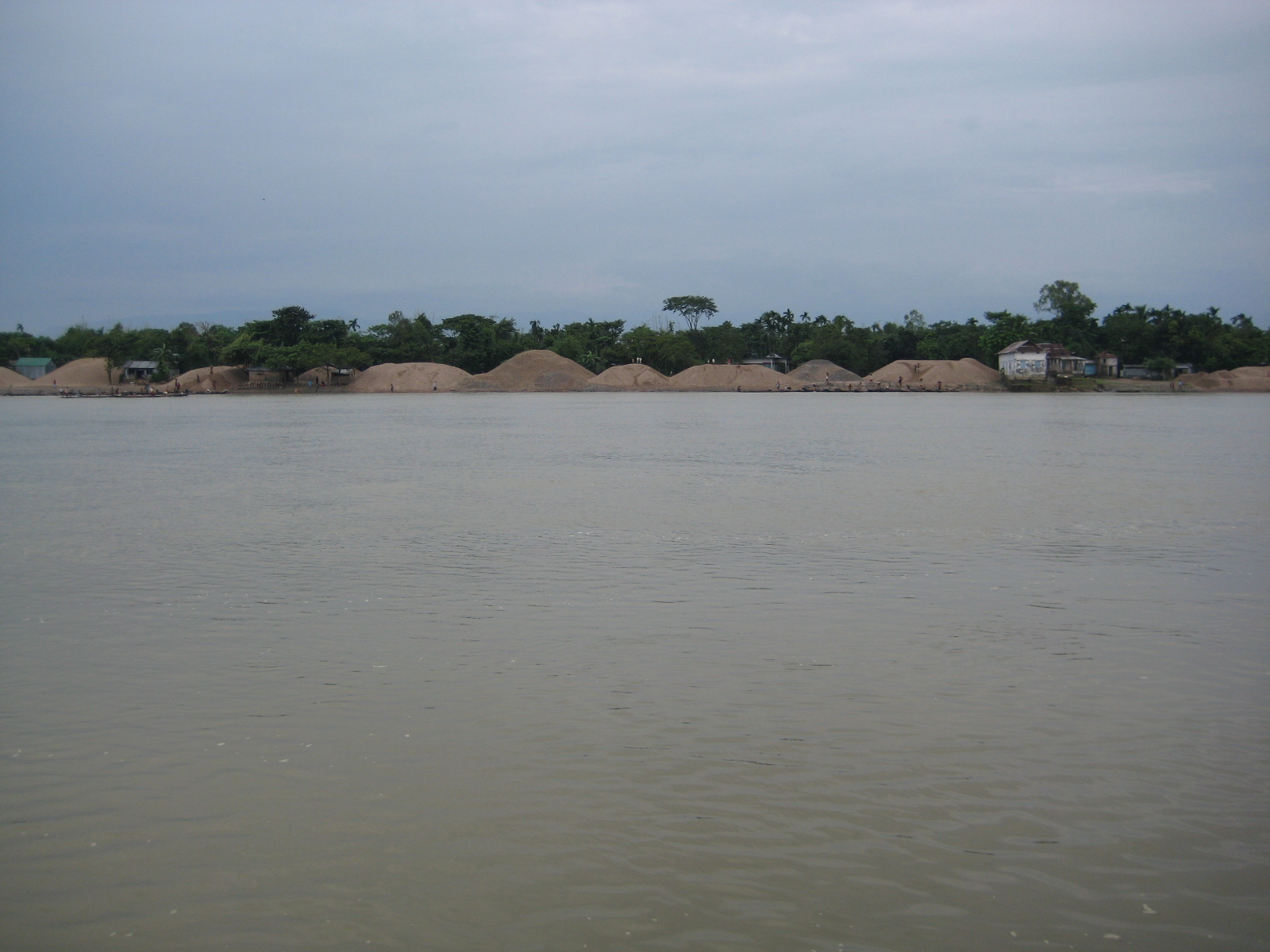

- Location in Bangladesh

Location
- Country: Bangladesh and India
- Division: Sylhet Division and Barak Valley
- District: Sylhet, Sunamganj, Kishoreganj and Cachar

Physical characteristics
- Source: Barak River
- Mouth: Meghna River
  - coordinates: 25°01′N 91°21′E
- Length: 249 km (155 mi)
- Depth
  - average: 282 feet (86 m)
  - maximum: 550 feet (170 m)

The Surma (Bengali: সুরমা নদী, romanized: Śurmā nôdī) is a major transboundary river in Bangladesh and Assam, part of the Surma-Meghna River System. It starts when the Barak River from northeast India divides at the Bangladesh border into the Surma and the Kushiyara rivers at the junction of Cachar and Karimganj districts. It ends in Kishoreganj District, above Bhairab Bāzār, where the two rivers rejoin to form the Meghna River, which ultimately flows into the Bay of Bengal in Bhola District.

== Course ==
From its source in the Manipur Hills near Mao Songsang, in India, the river is known as the Barak River. At the border with Bangladesh, the river divides into two branches, the northern branch being called the Surma River and the southern the Kushiyara River. This is where the river enters the Sylhet Depression (or trough) which forms the Surma Basin.

The Surma is fed by tributaries from the Meghalaya Hills to the north, and is also known as the Baulai River after it is joined by the south-flowing Someshwari River.

The Kushiyara receives tributaries from the Sylhet Hills and Tripura Hills to the south, the principal one from the Tripura Hills being the Manu. The Kushiyara is also known as the Kalni River after it is joined by a major offshoot (distributary) from the Surma. When the Surma and the Kushiyara finally rejoin in Kishoreganj District above Bhairab Bazar, the river is known as the Meghna.

The Surma passes through many haors, which are bowl-shaped shallow depressions.

== Gallery ==
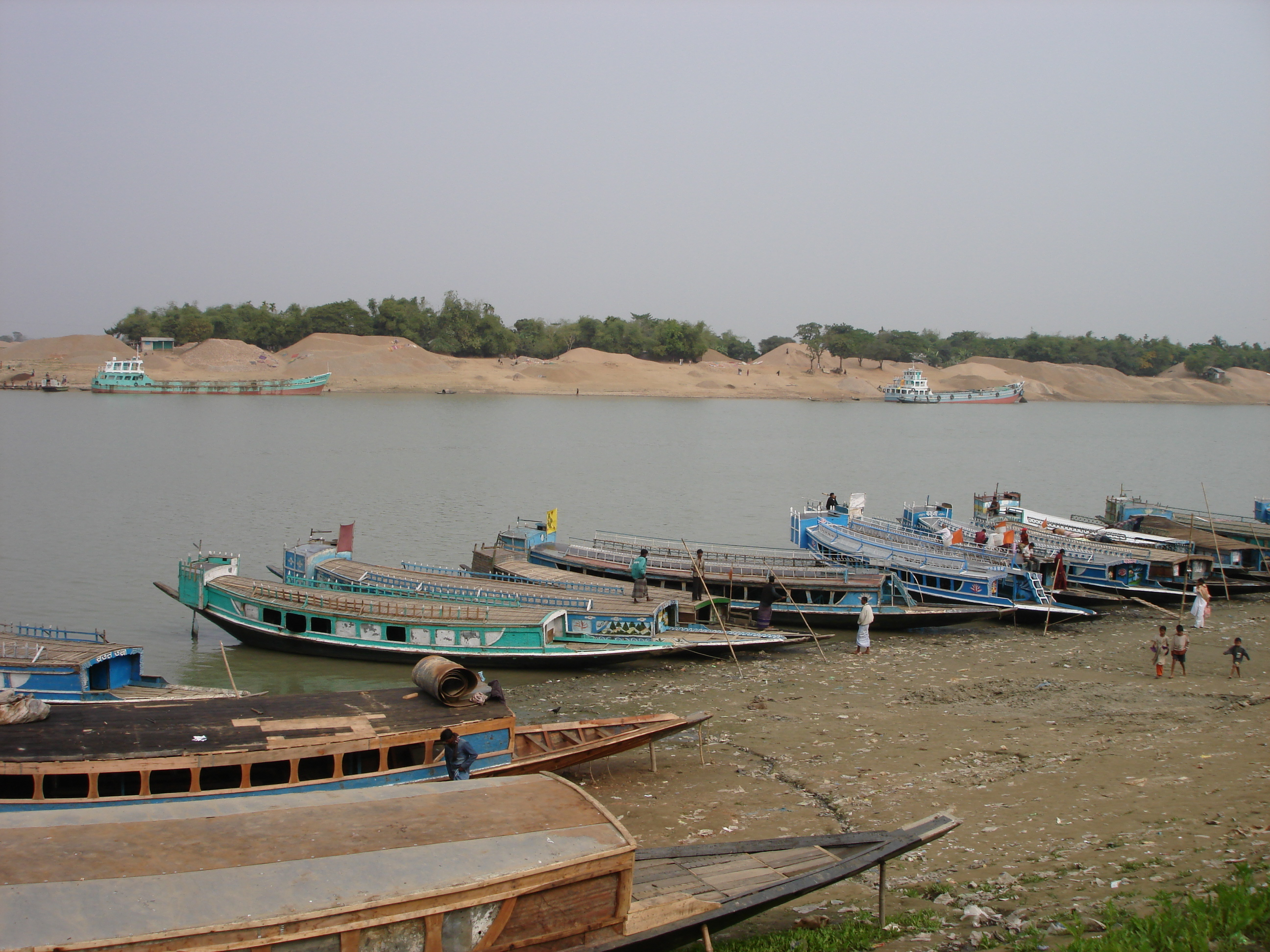

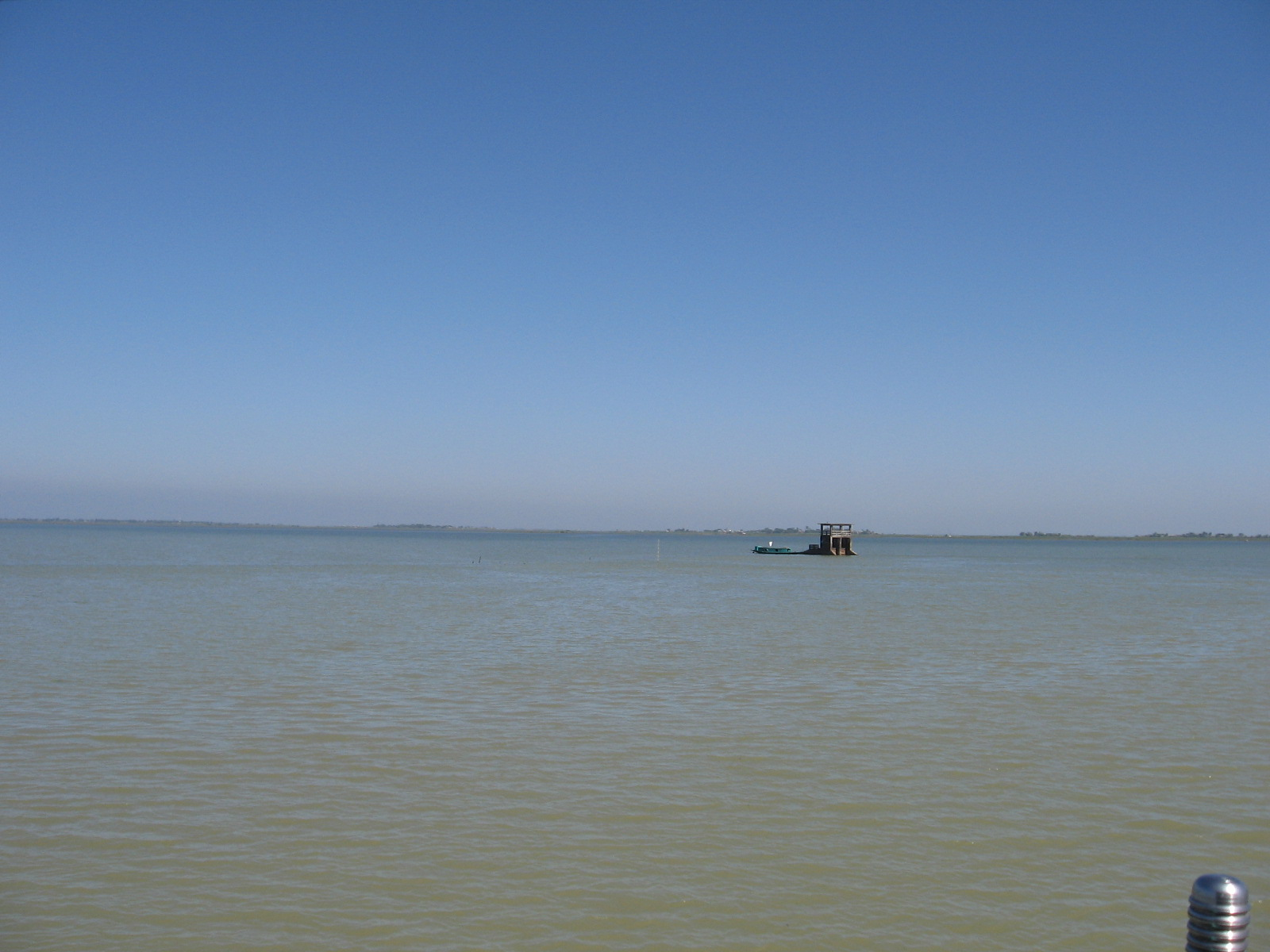

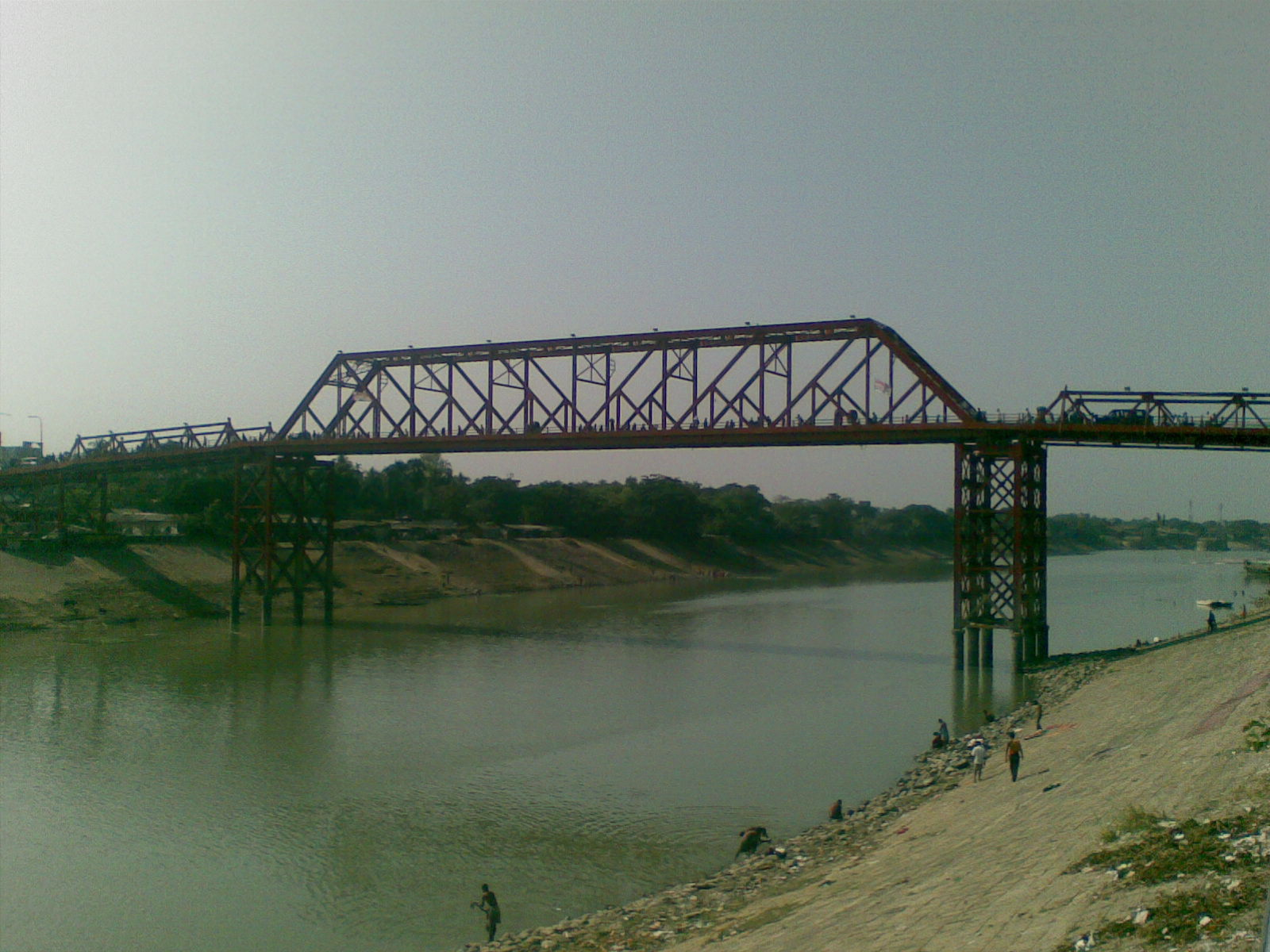
