= Someshwari River =

River in India and Bangladesh

Coordinates: 25.0962°N 90.6868°E

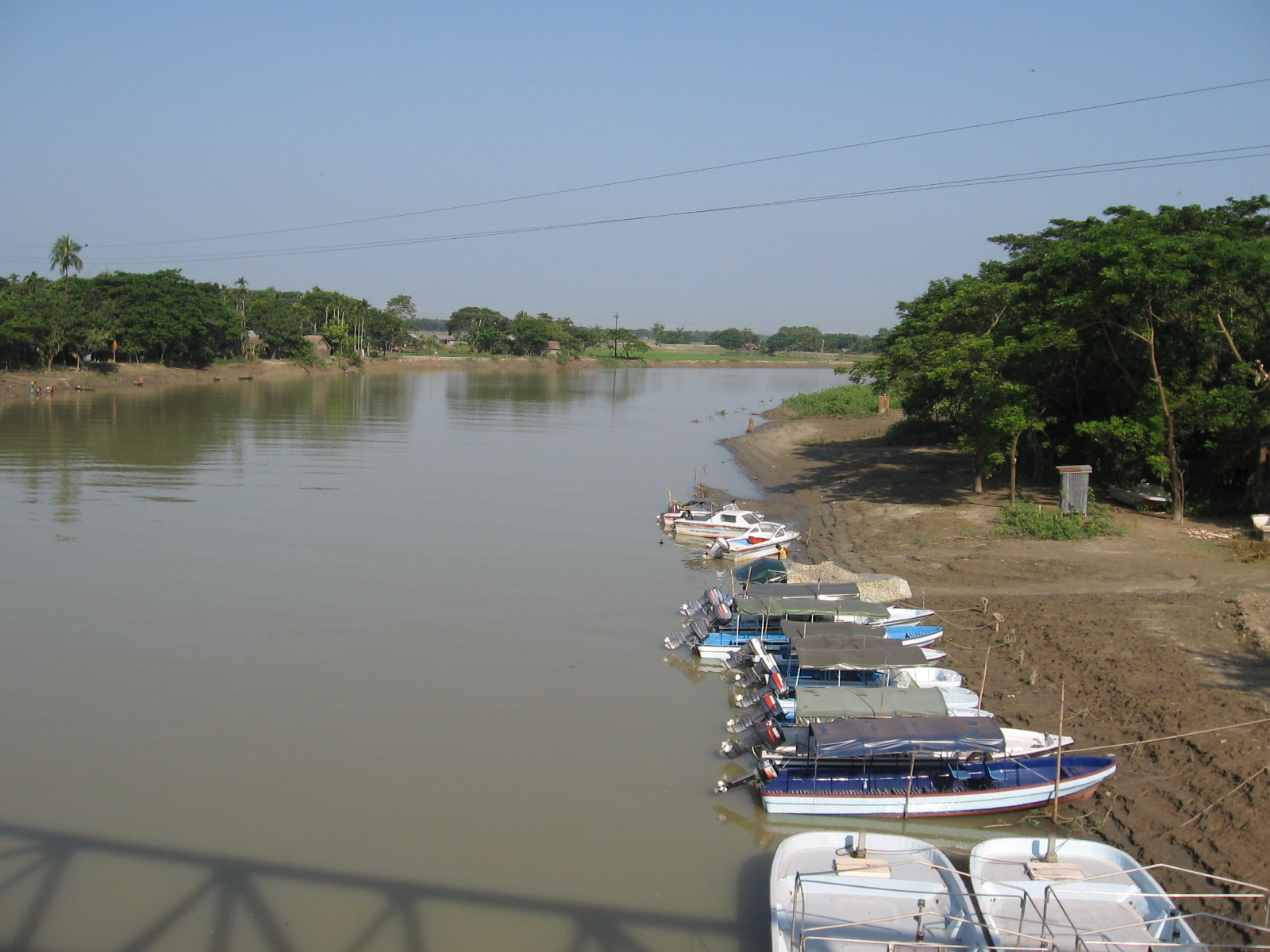
Someshwari River in Netrakona district of Bangladesh

Someshwari River, known as the Singsang chi or Simsang wari by the A.chik tribe (Bengali: সোমেশ্বরী নদী), known as Simsang River in the Indian state of Meghalaya, originates from the Nokrek Range and flows into Bangladesh.

The Simsang is a major river in the Garo Hills of Meghalaya and Netrakona District of Bangladesh. It divides the Garo Hills into two. The river is the main source of water for agriculture along its banks. It is the longest and largest river in the Garo Hills region of Meghalaya.

== Bangladesh ==
In Bangladesh it flows through the Susang-Durgapur and other areas of Netrakona District till it flows into the Kangsha River. A branch of the river flows towards Kalmakanda and meets the Balia River. Another branch of the river flows through the haor areas of Sunamganj District and into the Surma River. It is one of Bangladesh's trans-boundary rivers.
