= Surma-Meghna River System =

River in Bangladesh

Coordinates: 24.4414°N 91.0731°E

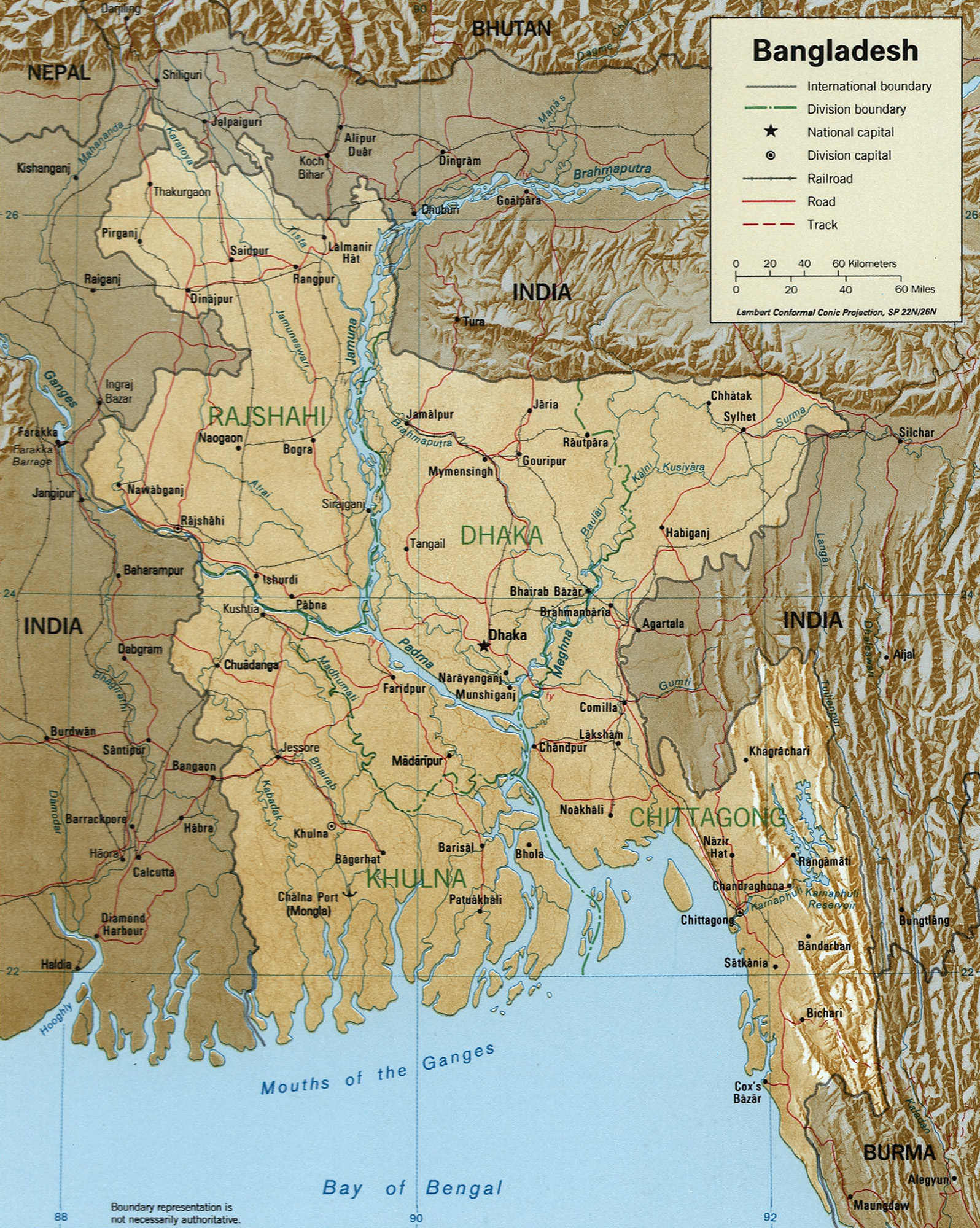
A map showing major rivers in Bangladesh including the Meghna

The Surma-Meghna River System is a river complex in the Indian subcontinent, one of the three that form the Ganges Delta, the largest on earth. It rises in the Manipur Hills of northeast India as the Barak River, flows west to become the Surma River, then flows south as the Meghna River out to the Bay of Bengal. In total, the river system spans 946 kilometres (588 mi), of which 669 kilometres (416 mi) are within Bangladesh.

== Course ==
=== Barak ===
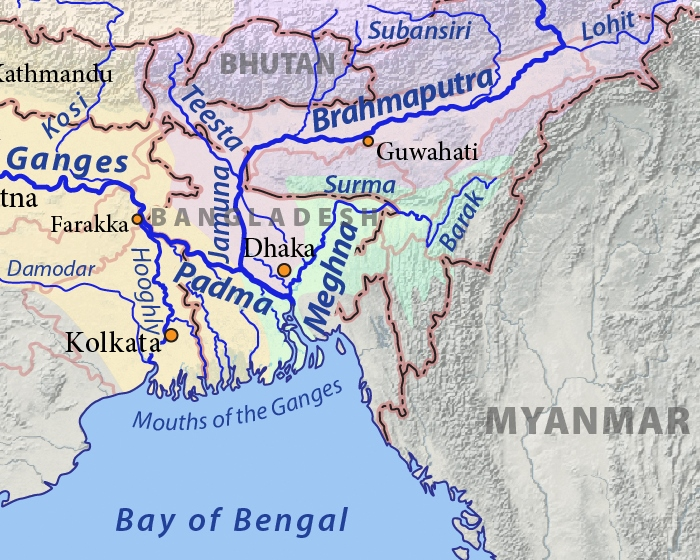
Meghna River Basin

From its source in the Manipur Hills of India, Liyai Village of Poumai tribe, the river is known as the Barak River (locally known as Avoure). Near its source, the river receives a number of tributaries, including the Irang, Makru, Tuivai, Jiri, Gumti, Howrah, Kagni, Senai Buri, Hari Mangal, Kakrai, Kurulia, Balujhuri, Shonaichhari and Durduria. It flows south through Manipur State, then southwest leaving Manipur and entering Assam State at Tipaimukh or Ruonglevaisuo after abruptly veering north at its confluence with the Tuivai.

In Assam State, the Barak flows northward then west receiving many small tributaries in the Cachar Valley Assam State. It continues to flow west past the town of Silchar where it is joined by the Madhura River. After Silchar, it flows for about 30 kilometres (19 mi), and near Badarpur it divides into the Surma River and the Kushiyara River and enters Bangladesh. The principal tributaries of the Barak in India are the Irang, Makru, Tuivai, Jiri, the Dhaleshwari (Tlawng), the Singla, the Longai, the Madhura, the Sonai (Tuirial), the Rukni and the Katakhal.

=== Surma ===
After entering into modern Karimganj District in south Assam, Barak divides in two, with the northern branch being called the Surma River and the southern branch the Kushiyara River. At this point the river enters the Sylhet Depression (or trough) which forms the Surma Basin.

The Surma is fed by tributaries from the Meghalaya Hills to the north, and is also known as the Baulai River after it is joined by the south-flowing Someswari River.

The Kushiyara receives tributaries from the Sylhet Hills and Tripura Hills to the south, the principal one from the Tripura Hills being the Manu. The Kushiyara is also known as the Kai River after it is joined by a major offshoot (distributary) from the Surma. When the Surma and the Kushiyara finally rejoin in Kishoreganj District above Bhairab Bazar, the river is known as the Meghna River.

=== Meghna ===
The Meghna is formed inside Bangladesh above Bhairab Bazar by the combination of the Surma and Kushiyara rivers. Down to Chandupura, Meghna is hydrographically referred to as the Upper Meghna. After the Padma joins, it is referred to as the Lower Meghna.

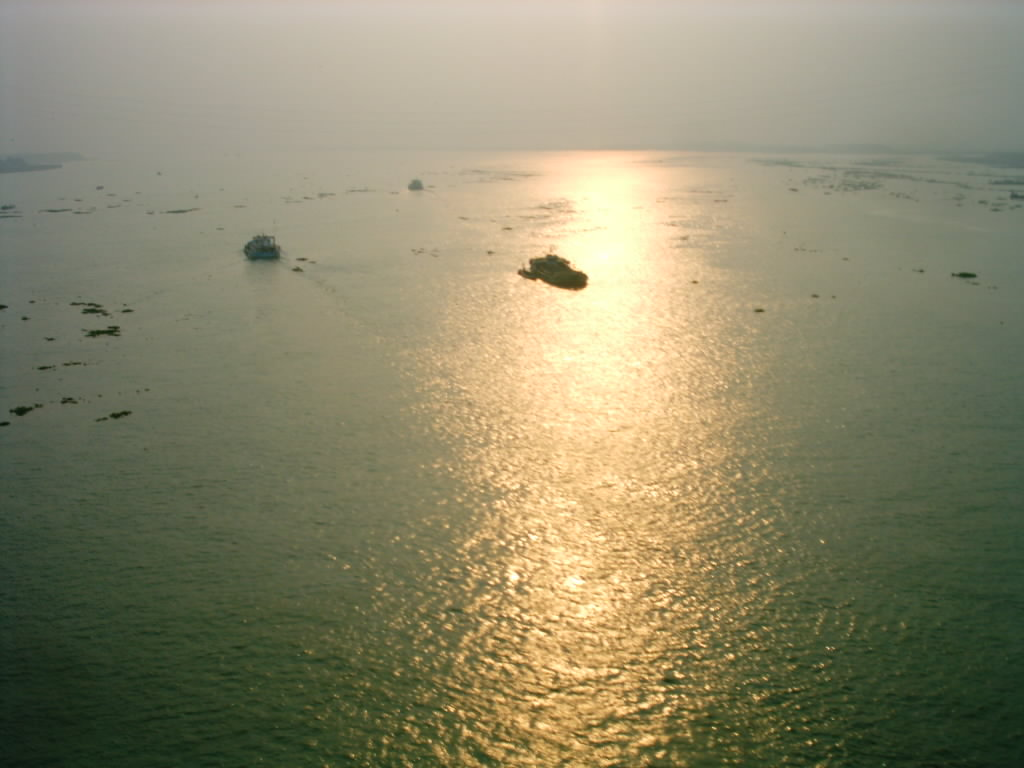
River Meghna from the bridge over the river

In Daudkandi, Comilla, Meghna is joined by the great river Gumti, created by the combination of many streams. This river reinforces Meghna a lot and increases the waterflow considerably. The pair of bridges over Meghna and Gop are two of the country's longest bridges.

The name for the largest distributary of the Ganges in Bangladesh is the Padma River. When the Padma joins with the Jamuna River, the largest distributary of the Brahmaputra, and they join with the Meghna in Chandpur District, the result is the Lower Meghna.

After Chandpur, with the combined flow of the Padma and Jamuna, it moves down to the Bay of Bengal in an almost straight line. In the course from Chandpur to the Bay of Bengal, the Meghna splits into a number of little rivers, but the main flow is through the Meghna Estuary.

Near Bhola, just before flowing into the Bay of Bengal, the river divides into two main streams in the Ganges delta and separates an island from both sides of the mainland. The western stream is called Ilsha and the eastern one is called Bamni.

== See also ==
- List of rivers in Bangladesh
