= Kulik River =

River in Bangladesh and India

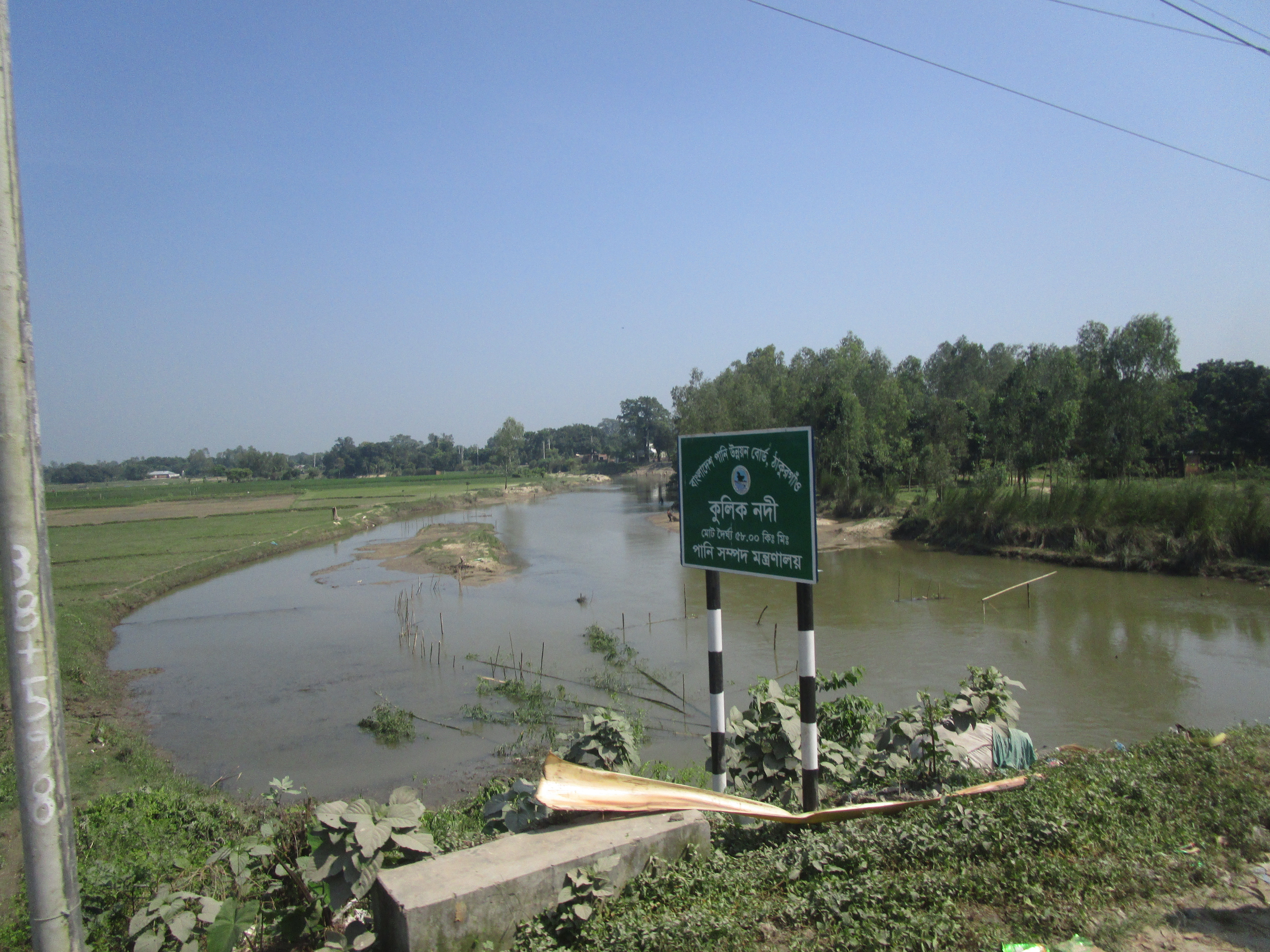

Location
- Countries: India and Bangladesh
- States: West Bengal and Bihar
- Division: Rajshahi
- Cities: Ranisankail; Raiganj; Malda City

Physical characteristics
- Source: Baliadangi upazila, Thakurgaon district, Bangladesh
- Mouth: Ganges
  - location: Godagiri, Nawabganj District, Bangladesh
  - coordinates: 24°29′24″N 88°18′14″E
- Length: 360 km (220 mi)
- Basin size: 20,600 km^{2} (8,000 sq mi)

Basin features
- Tributaries
  - left: Tangon River, Nagar River (Rangpur)
  - right: Mechi River, Kankai River, Balason River, Kalindri River

The Kulik River is a trans-boundary river that flows through the Indian states of West Bengal and Bihar, and Rangpur Division of Bangladesh

== India ==
In West Bengal, it goes through North Dinajpur district and has a bird sanctuary around it. In 2017, the river flooded resulting in the death of three people. The river has shrank due illegal dumping of waste and grabbing of land by the river. The government of West Bengal has been trying to revive the river.

== Bangladesh ==
It goes through Thakurgaon District in Bangladesh. The people of Thakurgaon have been demanding the government of Bangladesh build a bridge on Kulik River. The palace of Raja Tonkonath lies by the banks of Kulik River.
