= Ganges Basin =

Part of the Ganges-Brahmaputra basin

Coordinates: 25.7°N 84.9°E

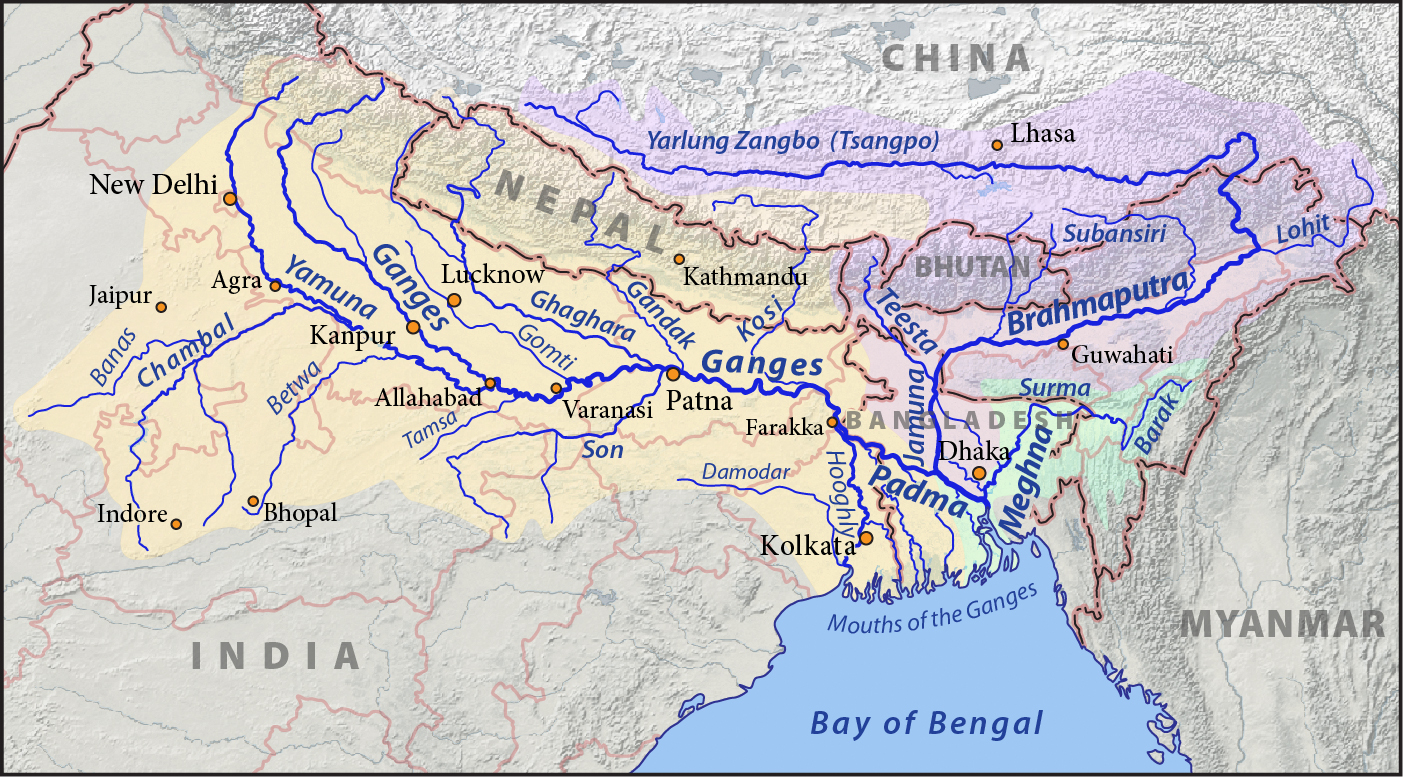
Ganges-Brahmaputra-Meghna basins

The Ganges Basin is a major part of the Ganges-Brahmaputra-Meghna (GBM) basin draining 1,999,000 square kilometres in Tibet, Nepal, India and Bangladesh. To the north, the Himalaya or lower parallel ranges beyond form the Ganges-Brahmaputra divide. On the west the Ganges Basin borders the Indus basin and then the Aravalli ridge. Southern limits are the Vindhyas and Chota Nagpur Plateau. On the east the Ganges merges with the Brahmaputra through a complex system of common distributaries into the Bay of Bengal. Its catchment lies in the states of Uttar Pradesh (294,364 km^{2}), Madhya Pradesh (198,962 km^{2}), Bihar (143,961 km^{2}), Rajasthan (112,490 km^{2}), West Bengal (71,485 km^{2}), Haryana (34,341 km^{2}), Himachal Pradesh (4,317 km^{2}), Delhi, Arunachal Pradesh (1,484 km^{2}), the whole of Bangladesh, Nepal and Bhutan. Several tributaries rise inside Tibet before flowing south through Nepal. The basin has a population of more than 500 million, making it the most populated river basin in the world.

== Description of the Ganges basin ==
The Ganges River flows into Bangladesh and mixes in the Brahmaputra River, creating the basin.

The basin comprises semi-arid valleys in the rain shadow north of the Himalaya, densely forested mountains south of the highest ranges, the scrubby Shiwalik foothills and the fertile Gangetic Plains. Central highlands south of the Gangetic Plain have plateaus, hills and mountains intersected by valleys and river plains. The important soil types found in the basin are sand, loam, clay and their combinations such as sandy loam, silty clay etc.

The annual surface water potential of the basin has been assessed as 525 km^{3} in India, out of which 250 km^{3} is utilisable water. There is about 580,000 km^{2} of arable land; 29.5% of the cultivable area of India.

Water-related issues of the basin are due to both high and low flows. In India, the states of Uttrakhand, Uttar Pradesh, Bihar and West Bengal are affected by floods. Bangladesh – at the confluence of Brahmaputra River and Ganges River – suffers from severe floods almost every year. Northern Ganges tributaries such as Kosi, Gandak and Mahananda are the most flood-prone, but southern tributaries also contribute. Low flows are caused by scarcity of rainfall outside the summer Monsoon, and sometimes by failure of this monsoon to develop to its normal extent. The Ganges is joined by Kosi, Ghaghra, Gandak from the Himalayas and by Chambal, Betwa, Son from the peninsular region.

== See also ==
- Foreland basin
- Forebulge
