= Narandia Union, Purbadhala =

Coordinates: 24.8510°N 90.6473°E

Narandia is a Union of Purbadhala Upazila in the district of Netrakona, Mymensingh Division, Bangladesh.

== Demographics ==
Narandia Union is considered to be one of the most important Unions in Purbadhala Upazila, due in part to both its location and its size.

== Markets ==
The following village markets are located within Narandia Union:

- Narandia Bazaar
- Hiranpur Bazaar
- Shahabajpur Bazaar
- Shaud kona Bazar
- Ghater Bazar
- Dailer Bazar
- Vober Bazar
- SOYA Bazar
- Palima Bazar

== Administration ==
The following villages are located within the Narandia Union:

- Narandia
- Yaron
- Narnarianpur
- Paikura
- Boulam
- Dulchapur
- Krishna Jeebon Pur
- Mohendrepur
- Sreepur
- Nijampur
- Shahbajpur
- Tulabaid
- Dhamdorvity
- Pailaty
- Vugi
- Jauany
- Shawod Kona
- Baboi Dohor
- Shaan kola
- Hobibpur
- Daponia-Shewra Dail
- Shawod Kona
- Khoshkoshia
