= Longai River =

Trans-boundary river in India and Bangladesh

Coordinates: 24.5688°N 92.3286°E

Longai river at Karimganj town

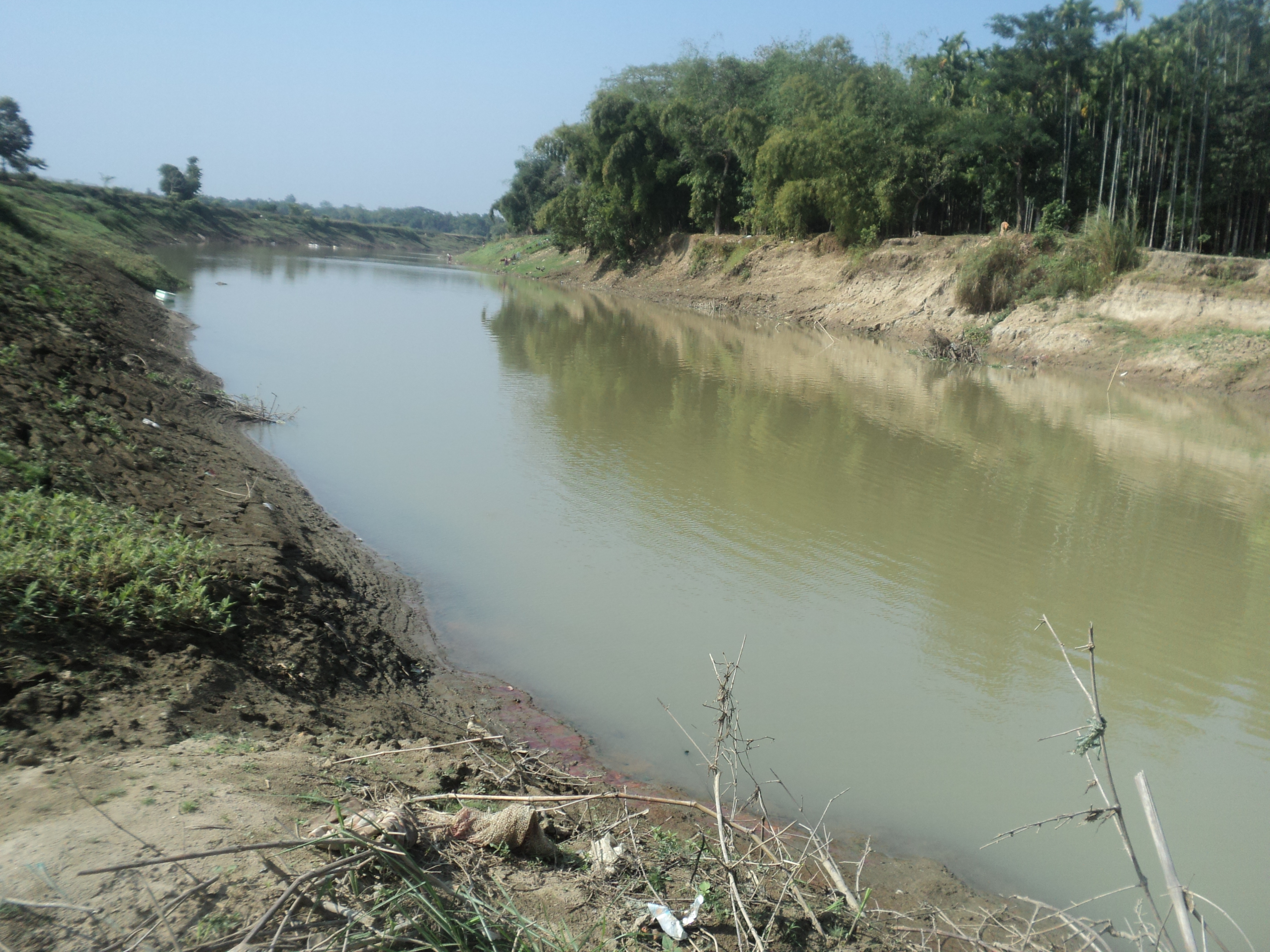
Longai river at Karimganj

The Longai River is a trans-boundary river in India and Bangladesh. It rises in Jampui Hills in the Indian state of Tripura. It flows through part of Mizoram before entering Karimganj district of Assam. Later it enters Bangladesh, and drains in Hakaluki Haor.

== See also ==
- List of rivers in Bangladesh
