= Hugla Union =

Place in Bangladesh

Coordinates: 24.9776°N 90.5361°E

Hugla Union (also spelled as Hogla) is a union parishad situated at the north-west side of Purbadhala Upazila, Netrakona District, Mymensingh Division, Bangladesh. It stands on the bank of the Kongsho river. The Dhobaura Upazila of Mymensingh District is situated at the North and West side of the Hugla Union.
