= Kushiyara River =

River in Indian subcontinent

Coordinates: 24.6266°N 91.7782°E

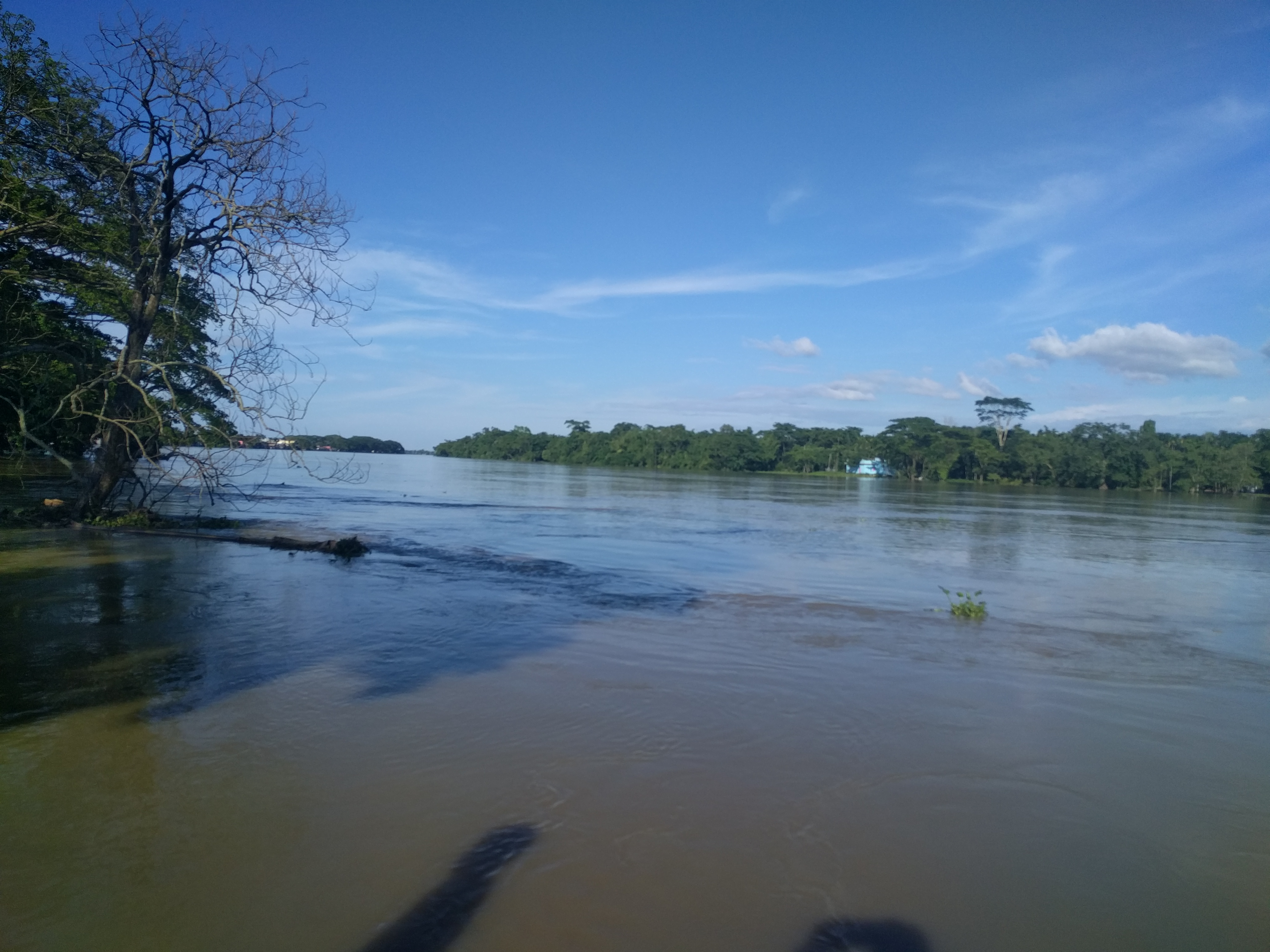
Kushiyara river, Sylhet

The Kushiyara (Bengali: কুশিয়ারা নদী, romanized: Kuśiara Nôdi) is a transboundary river in Bangladesh and Assam, India. It forms on the India-Bangladesh border as a branch of the Barak River, when the Barak bifurcates into the Kushiyara and Surma. The waters that eventually form the Kushiyara originate in the uplands of the state of Assam and pick up tributaries from Nagaland and Manipur.

== Geography ==
From its origin at the mouth of the Barak, also known as the Amlshid bifurcation point, the Kushiyara flows westward forming the boundary between Assam, India, and the Sylhet District of Bangladesh. It flows between the towns of Zakigonj, Sylhet, and Karīmganj, Assam, and after the village of Pānjipuri entirely flows in the Beanibazar Upazila of Bangladesh. It then flows southwestward past the village of Deulgrām in Kurar Bazar Union where the river turns southward passing the village of Badepasha, Uttar Bade Pasha Union, Golapganj Upazila, where it again turns southwestward. It is joined from the left (east) by the Juri River at Fenchuganj Bazar. At Beel Pond (Pukhuri Beel) the river turns westward where it flows past the village of Balaganj Bazar in Balaganj Upazila, then southwestward past the villages of Hamjāpur, Abdullāpur and Manumukh. The river, after being joined from the left (south) by the Manu River, flows northwest past the villages of Aorangapur, Tajpur, and Pāilgaon, where it is joined by the small Itakhola River and assumes a westward direction. After the village of Mārkuli the river heads southwest past the village of Pāhārpur to the village of Ajmiriganj Bazar. After that the river forms several braided streams and heads south where it is joined by the Khowai River from the left (east) and heads southwest where it is rejoined by the Surma (locally known as the Danu River) from the right (north) and becomes the Meghna River, just north of the town of Bhairab Bazar. Altogether, the Kushiyara runs about 160 kilometers. At its deepest, during the rainy season, the Kushiyara can reach a depth of 10 meters. During the dry season it can appear to dry up almost completely in a few places with the bulk of the load being carried subsurface, such as in the braided stream area south of Ajmiriganj Bazar.

In 2022 India and Bangladesh signed an interim water sharing pact with regard to the Kushiyara River, the first time in 25 years that such an agreement was reached between the two countries.

== Limnology ==
In 2018, a limnology study was conducted by the Department of Fisheries from the University of Dhaka and the Department of Environment and Natural Sciences from Yokohama National University in Yokohama, Japan. Based on the collected data, the water quality parameters measured at the seven study areas along the Kushiyara River are relatively consistent.

- The temperature ranges from 28.2 °C to 29.2 °C, with most study areas having a temperature around 28.5 °C to 28.9 °C. The dissolved oxygen (DO) levels are also consistent, ranging from 6.73 mg/L to 7.09 mg/L.
- Transparency, which measures water clarity, varies more widely among the study areas, with values ranging from 36.0 cm at Jamargaon to 50.0 cm at Monumukh. This suggests that there may be differences in the number of suspended particles or algae present in the water at these locations.
- The pH values at all study areas are within a narrow range of 6.4 to 6.9, indicating that the water is slightly acidic to neutral. Electrical conductivity (EC) and total dissolved solids (TDS) values are also relatively consistent among the study areas, with EC ranging from 76.7 μS/cm to 81.6 μS/cm and TDS ranging from 38.1 mg/L to 40.9 mg/L.
- Salinity, as measured by the percentage of NaCl, is low at all study areas, with values ranging from 0.1% to 0.2%. This indicates that the water in the Kushiyara River is fresh and not influenced by seawater intrusion.

== See also ==
- List of rivers in Bangladesh
