= Purbadhala Upazila =

Purbadhala পূর্বধলা
- Upazila
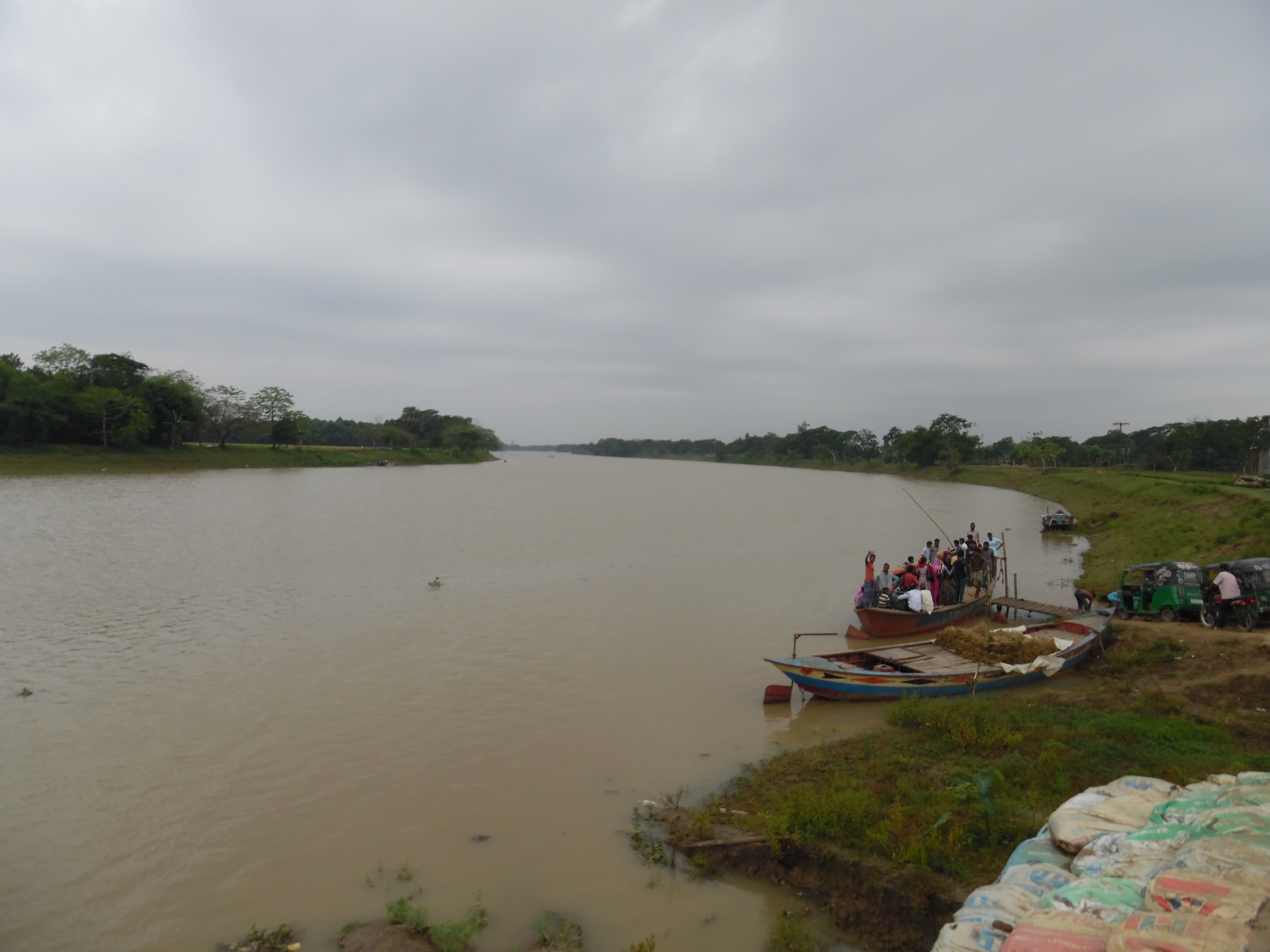
- Kangsha river at Purbadhala, Netrokona

- Coordinates: 24°56′N 90°36.2′E
- Country: Bangladesh
- Division: Mymensingh Division
- District: Netrokona District

Area
  - Total: 308.03 km^{2} (118.93 sq mi)

Population (2022)
  - Total: 332,398
  - Density: 1,079.1/km^{2} (2,794.9/sq mi)
- Time zone: UTC+6 (BST)
- Postal code: 2410
- Website: purbadhala.netrokona.gov.bd Official Map of Purbadhala

Purbadhala Upazila mauza geocode map

Purbadhala (Bengali: পূর্বধলা) is an upazila of Netrokona District in the Division of Mymensingh, Bangladesh.

== Geography ==
Purbadhala is located at 24.9333°N 90.6028°E. It has a total area of 308.03 km^{2} (118.93 sq mi). It is bounded by Durgapur and Kalmakanda upazilas on the north, Kendua and Gauripur upazilas on the south, Barhatta and Atpara upazilas on the east, Purbadhala upazila on the west.

== Demographics ==
Historical population
Year	Pop.	±%
1981	211,448	—
1991	235,675	+11.5%
2001	280,372	+19.0%
2011	310,834	+10.9%
2022	332,398	+6.9%
Source: Bangladesh Bureau of Statistics

Religions in Purbadhala Upazila (2022)
Religion	Percent
Islam	95.08%
Hinduism	4.66%
Other or not stated	0.26%

According to the 2022 Bangladeshi census, Purbadhala Upazila had 79,721 households and a population of 332,398. 11.59% of the population were under 5 years of age. Purbadhala had a literacy rate (age 7 and over) of 69.64%: 70.65% for males and 68.73% for females, and a sex ratio of 92.60 males for 100 females. 38,540 (11.59%) lived in urban areas.

== Administration ==
Netrokona Thana was formed in 1874 and it was turned into an upazila in 1983.

Purbadhala Upazila is divided into 11 union parishads: Agia, Bairaty, Bishkakuni, Dhalamulgaon, Ghagra, Gohalakanda, Hogla, Jaria, Khalishaur, Narandia, and Purbadhala. The union parishads are subdivided into 224 mauzas and 336 villages.

== See also ==
- Upazilas of Bangladesh
- Districts of Bangladesh
- Divisions of Bangladesh
