= Titas River =

Titas Titash
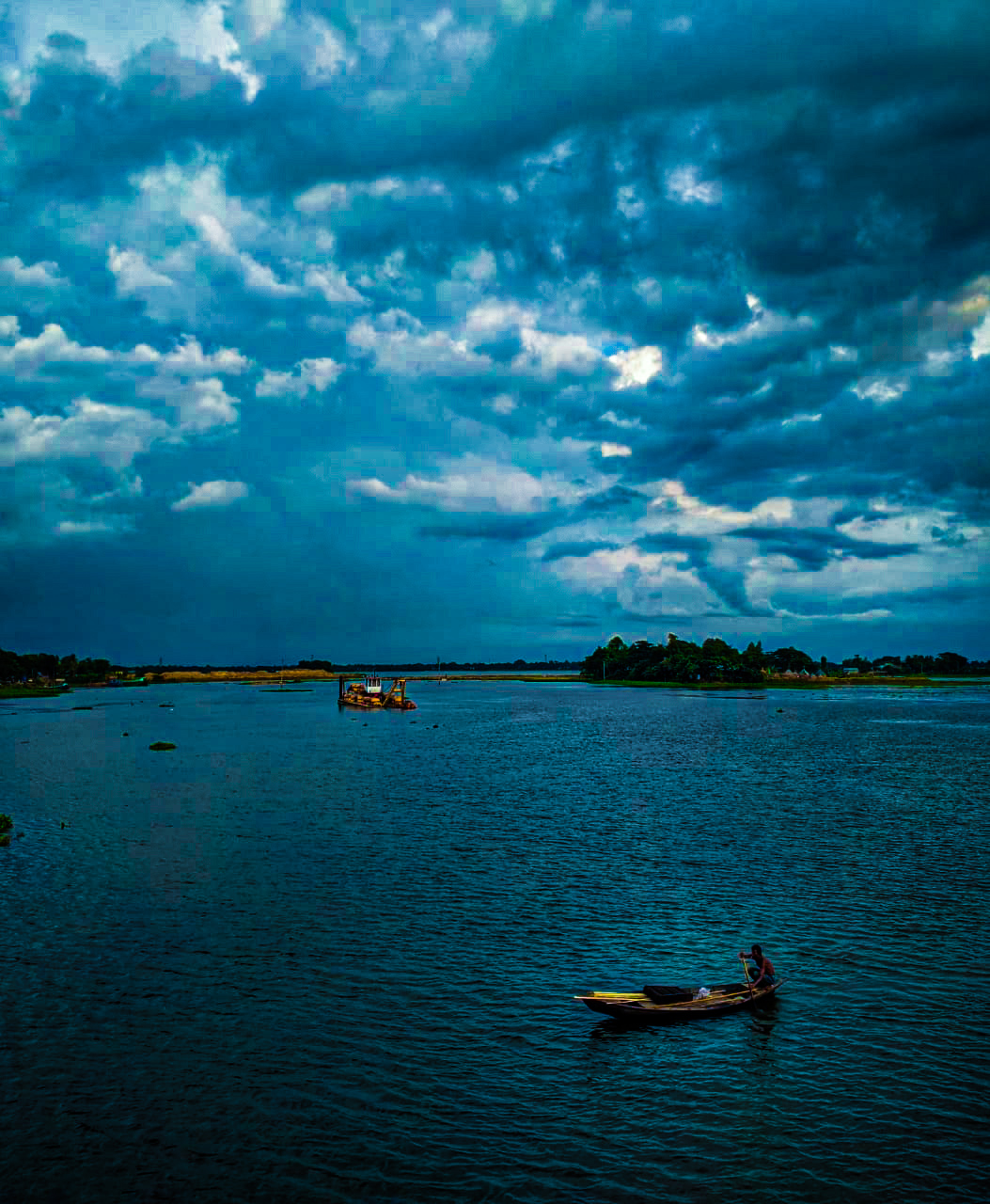
- Titas River, seen from Brahmanbaria
- Etymology: Possibly from Bengali তিতা (tita), meaning "bitter" or "wet"
- Native name: তিতাস (Bengali)

Location
- Division: Chittagong

Physical characteristics
- Source: Meghna River
- Mouth
  - location: Bay of Bengal via the Meghna River
- Length: 98 km (61 mi)

Basin features
- River system: Surma-Meghna River System

The Titas (Bengali: তিতাস Titāsa; also Romanized Titash) is a river in Bangladesh which merges into the Meghna river and forms part of the Surma-Meghna River System. The Titas starts its journey from Sarail Upazila, Brahmanbaria. The river is 98 kilometres (61 mi) long and again meets the Meghna river near Nabinagar Upazila, Brahmanbaria. Bangladesh's first Y-shaped bridge is over this river connecting Comilla and Brahmanbaria.

== Geography ==
Titas Gas, the biggest natural gas reserve of Bangladesh located in Brahmanbaria, which supplies gas to capital Dhaka, is named after this river. One of the offshoots of the Meghna river is also named as the Titas. The river has become narrow and shallow in many places due to siltation.

== Depiction in popular culture ==
Titash Ekti Nadir Naam (A River Called Titas) is a 1956 novel by Bengali writer Adwaita Mallabarman and adapted into the 1973 film of the same name by Ritwik Ghatak. It is a depiction of the lives of a fishing community dependent on the Titas River.
