= Baghabari =

Village in Rajshahi, Bangladesh

Coordinates: 24°08′10″N 89°35′08″E

Baghabari is a village in Shahjadpur Upazila of Sirajganj District in the division of Rajshahi in Bangladesh.
