= Khowai River =

River in India & Bangladesh

Coordinates: 24°21′43″N 91°12′46″E

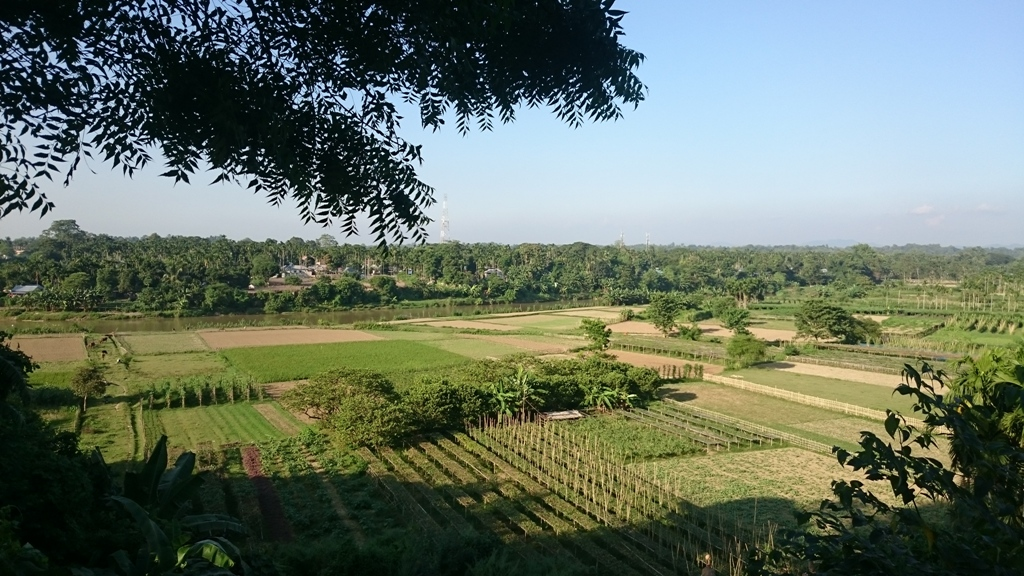
- Khowai River at Teliamura
- Native name: খোয়াই নদী (Bengali)

Location
- Countries: India and Bangladesh
- State: Tripura
- District: Habiganj

Physical characteristics
- Source
  - location: Atharamura Hills
- Length: 166 km (103 mi)

The Khowai is a trans-boundary river that originates in the eastern part of the Atharamura Hills of Tripura in India and later crosses into Bangladesh.

== Geography ==
Flowing north-north-west, it leaves India at Khowai, and enters Bangladesh at Balla in Habiganj District. The river passes east of Habiganj town, where it is under pressure from pollution and encroachment, including cultivation and construction of concrete houses in the areas on the banks of the Khowai. North of town it turns west, and joins the Kushiyara near Adampur in Lakhai Upazila, Habiganj District. The river is 166 km long. It is the second longest river of Tripura.

== See also ==
- List of rivers of Bangladesh
- List of rivers of India
- Rivers of India
