= Dhalai River =

Coordinates: 24.3553°N 91.8488°E

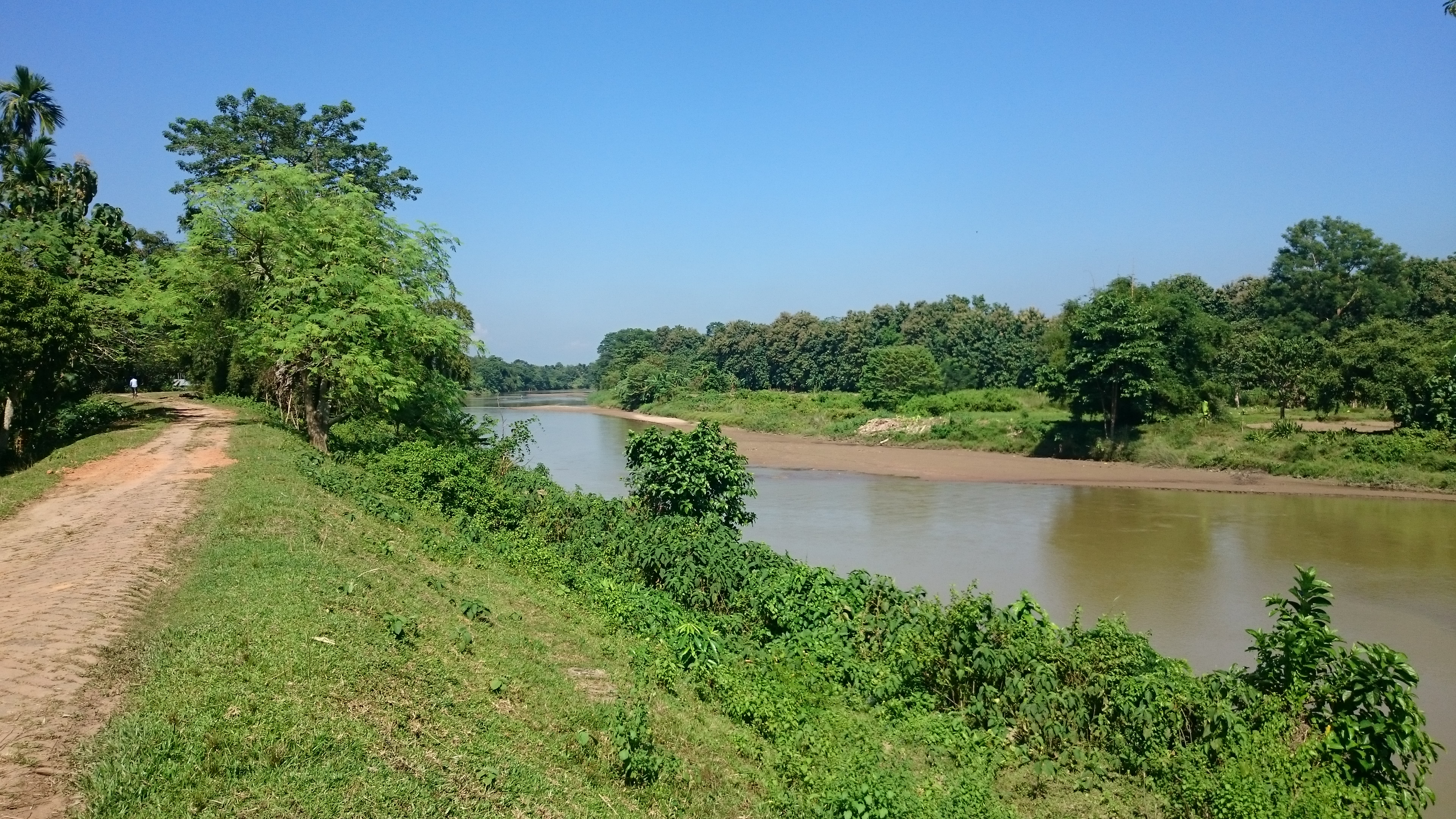
- Dhalai River near Kamalpur, Tripura

- Location within India

Location
- Countries: India and Bangladesh
- State: Tripura
- District: Moulvibazar
- Cities: Kamalpur; Ambassa

Physical characteristics
- Source: Atharamura Hill
  - location: Tripura, India
- Mouth: Manu River
  - location: Rajnagar Upazila, Bangladesh
- Length: 117 km (73 mi)

The Dhalai River (also known as Dhala River) is a trans-boundary river in India and Bangladesh. It rises in the mountains of the Indian state of Tripura. It enters Kamalganj Upazila of Maulvibazar District of Bangladesh. Later, it joins the Manu River in Rajnagar Upazila. The co-ordinates of the Dhalai River at Ambassa are 23.55'128'' N and 91.51'204'' E in degrees, minutes and seconds (DMS). This 117 kilometres (73 mi) long river originates in Atharamura Hill. Some of the popular riverside townships of the Dhalai are the towns of Ambassa, Baralutma and Kamalpur.

== Gallery ==
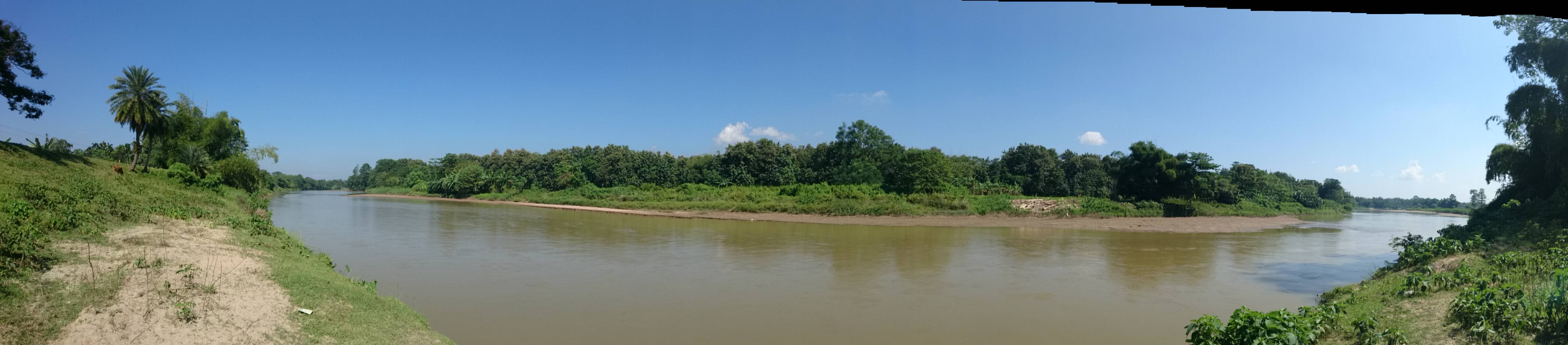
Dhalai River panorama

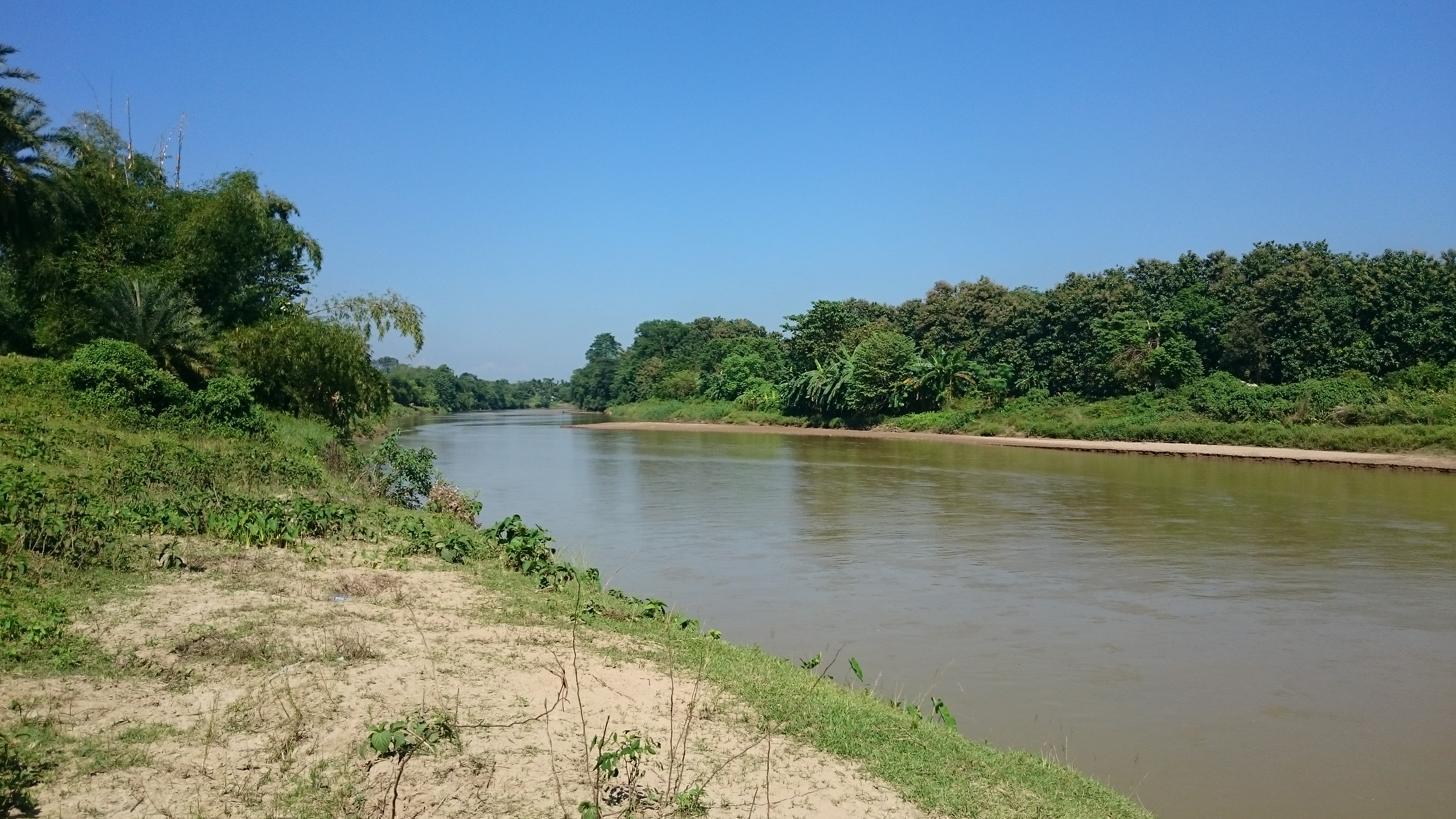
Dhalai River near Kamalpur

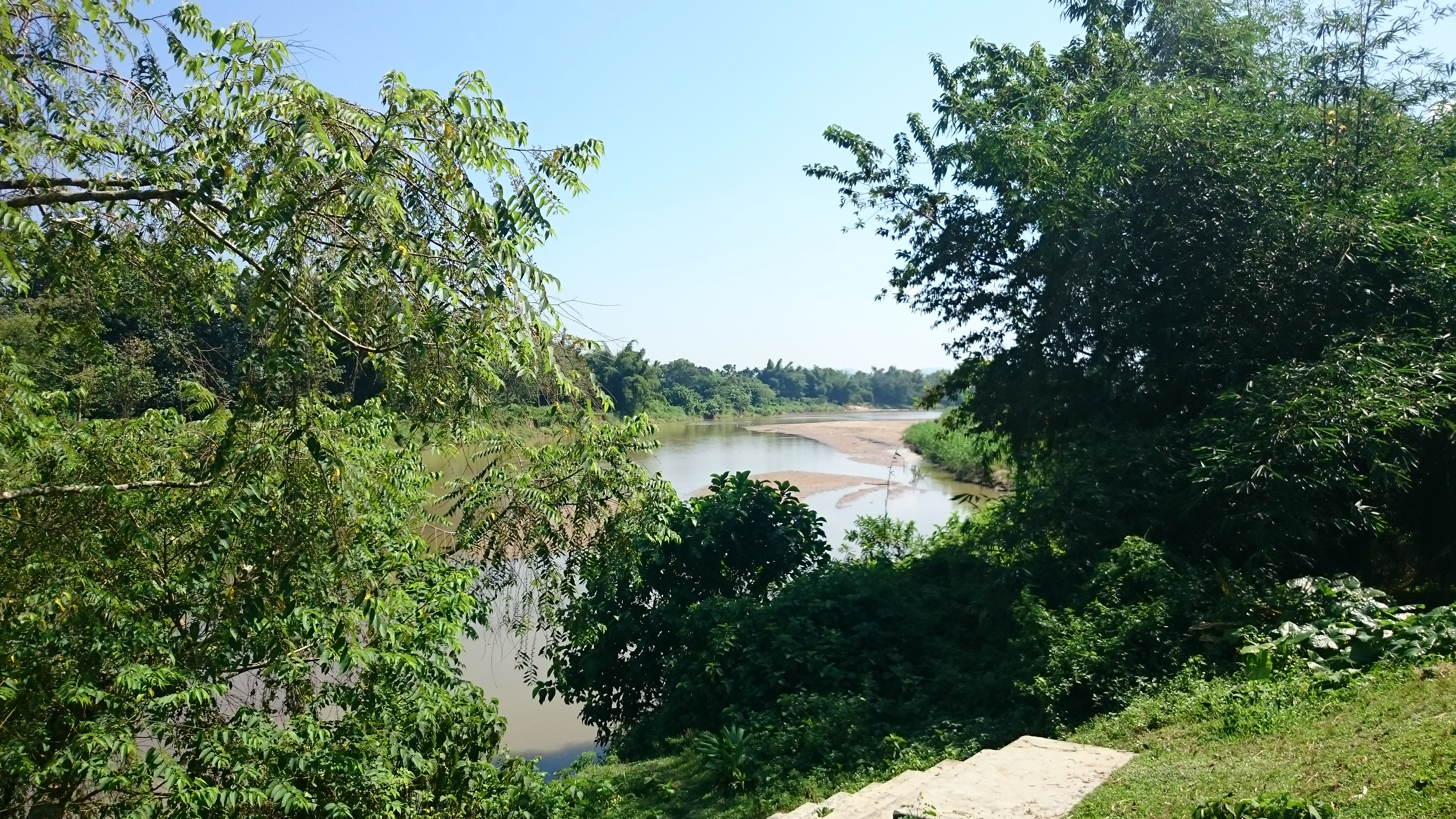
Dhalai River behind trees

== See also ==
- List of rivers of India
- List of rivers in Bangladesh
