= Meghna River =

River in Bangladesh

Meghna Lower Meghna
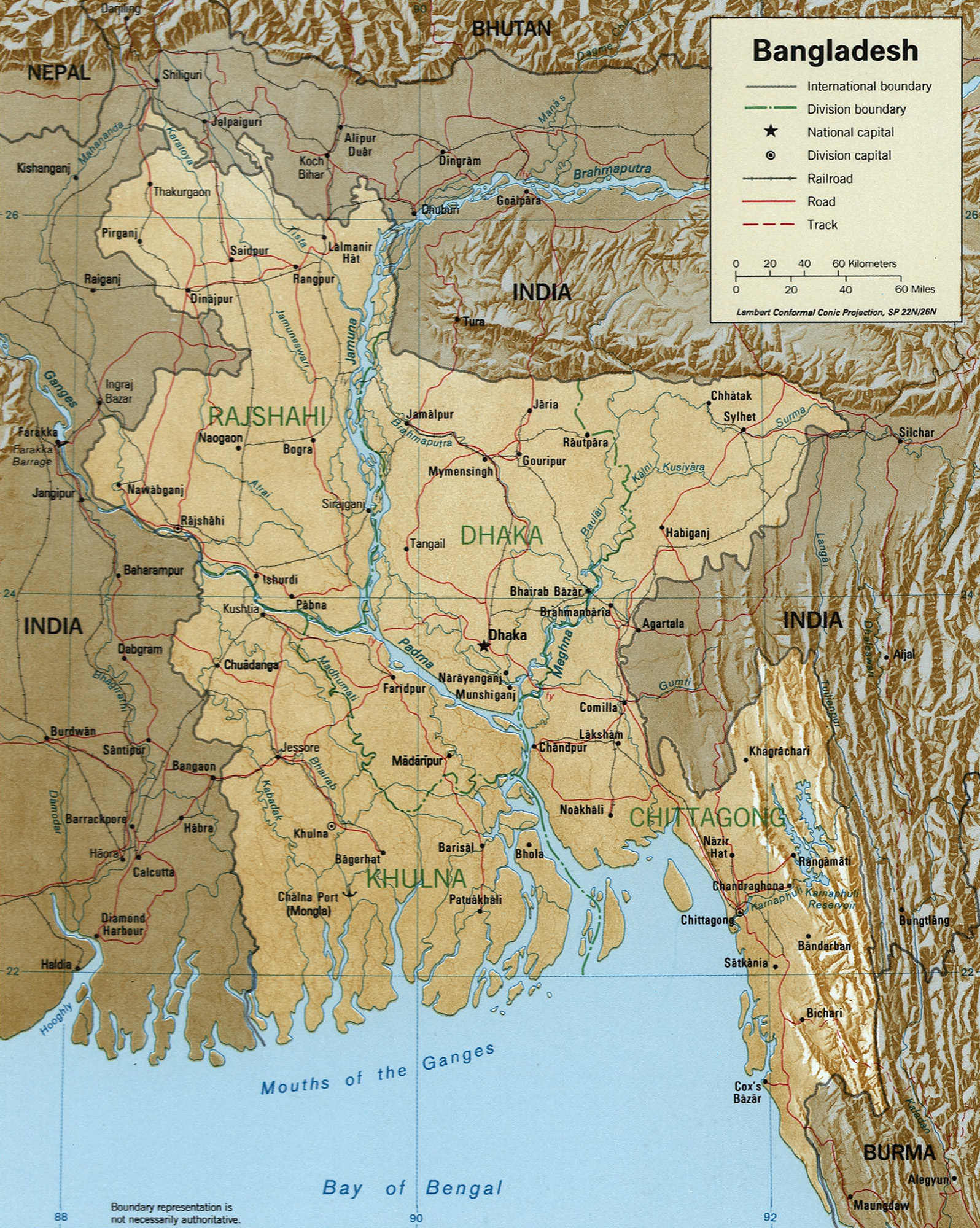
- Native name: মেঘনা (Bengali)

Location
- Countries: Bangladesh

Physical characteristics
- Source
  - location: Chandpur (Confluence of Padma and Upper Meghna)
  - coordinates: 23°13′11.1792″N 90°37′49.5708″E
  - elevation: 0.5 m (1 ft 8 in)
- Mouth
  - location: Bay of Bengal
  - coordinates: 22°0′46.7064″N 90°51′34.848″E
  - elevation: 0 m (0 ft)
- Length: 130 km (81 mi)
- Basin size: 1,578,050.1 km^{2} (609,288.5 sq mi)
- Discharge
  - location: Near mouth
  - average: (Period: 1971–2000)40,974.1 m^{3}/s (1,446,990 cu ft/s)
- Discharge
  - location: Chandpur
  - average: (Period: 1971–2000)40,532.9 m^{3}/s (1,431,410 cu ft/s)
  - minimum: 10,000 m^{3}/s (350,000 cu ft/s)
  - maximum: 160,000 m^{3}/s (5,700,000 cu ft/s)

Basin features
- River system: Ganges River
- Tributaries
  - left: Upper Meghna
  - right: Padma

The Meghna (Bengali: মেঘনা, romanized: Mēghnā) is one of the major rivers in Bangladesh, one of the three that form the Ganges Delta, the largest delta on earth, which fans out to the Bay of Bengal. A part of the Surma-Meghna River System, the Meghna is formed inside Bangladesh in Kishoreganj District above the town of Bhairab Bazar by the joining of the Surma and the Kushiyara, both of which originate in the hilly regions of eastern India as the Barak River. The Meghna meets its major tributary, the Padma, in Chandpur District. Other major tributaries of the Meghna include the Dhaleshwari, the Gumti, and the Feni. The Meghna empties into the Bay of Bengal in Bhola District via four principal mouths, named Tetulia (Ilsha), Shahbazpur, Hatia, and Bamni.

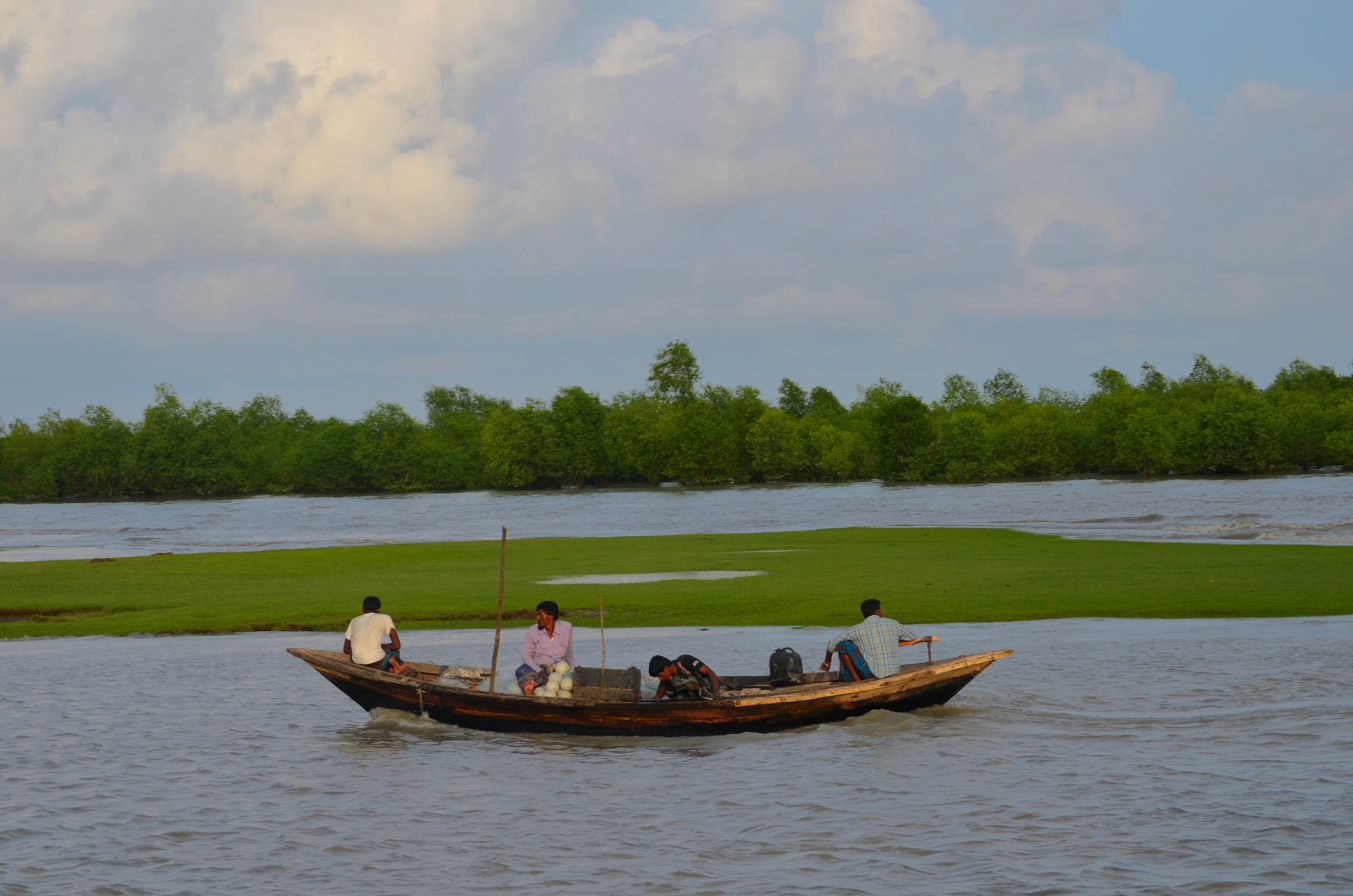
Boat in Meghna River

== Upper Meghna ==
=== Course ===
The Meghna is formed by the confluence of the Surma and Kushiyara rivers originating from the hilly regions of eastern India. Down to Chandpur, Meghna is hydrographically referred to as the Upper Meghna. After the Padma joins, it is referred to as the Lower Meghna.

Upper Meghna (Bengali: মেঘনা নদী) Barak, Surma, Kushyiara, Kalni
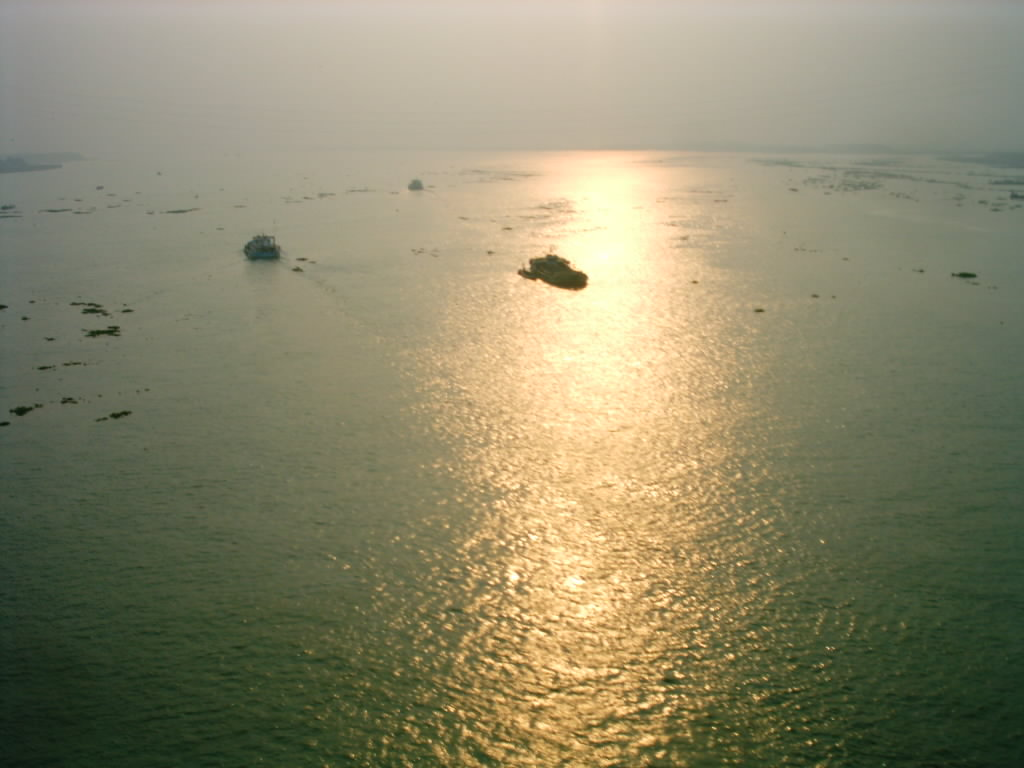
- A view of the Meghna from a bridge

Location
- Countries: Bangladesh

Physical characteristics
- Source
  - location: Confluence of Kalni and Ghorautra
  - coordinates: 24°9′16.902″N 90°59′9.8376″E
  - elevation: 1 m (3 ft 3 in)
- Mouth
  - location: Chandpur
  - coordinates: 23°15′19.4112″N 90°38′41.892″E
  - elevation: 0.5 m (1 ft 8 in)
- Length: 140 km (87 mi)(Upper Meghna–Kalni–Kushyiara–Barak 1,040 km)
- Basin size: 85,401.1 km^{2} (32,973.5 sq mi)
- Discharge
  - location: Chandpur
  - average: (Period: 1971–2000)5,603.2 m^{3}/s (197,880 cu ft/s)
- Discharge
  - location: Bhairab Bazar
  - average: (Period: 1984–2012)5,486 m^{3}/s (193,700 cu ft/s)
  - maximum: 13,000 m^{3}/s (460,000 cu ft/s)

Basin features
- Progression: Meghna (Lower Meghna) → Bay of Bengal
- River system: Ganges River
- Tributaries
  - left: Kalni, Gumti, Titas
  - right: Ghorautra, Old Brahmaputra, Dhaleshwari

Near Muladhuli in Barisal district, the Safipur River is an offshoot of the Surma that creates one of the main rivers in South Bengal. 1.5 km wide, this river is one of the widest in the country as well.

At Chatalpar of Brahmanbaria District, the river Titas emerges from Meghna and after circling two large bends by a distance of about 240 kilometres (150 mi), falls into the Meghna again near Nabinagar Upazila. The Titas forms as a single stream but braids into two distinct streams that remain separate before re-joining the Meghna.

In Daudkandi, (Comilla District), the Meghna is joined by the Gumti River, which increases the Meghna water flow considerably. The pair of bridges over the Meghna and Gumti are two of the country's largest bridges.

The Meghna is reinforced by the Dhaleshwari before Chandpur. Further down, the Padma River – the largest distributary of the Ganges in Bangladesh, along with the Jamuna River – the largest distributary of the Brahmaputra, join with the Meghna in Chandpur District, resulting in the Lower Meghna.

After Chandpur, the combined flow of the Padma, Jamuna, and Meghna moves down to the Bay of Bengal in an almost straight line, braiding occasionally into a number of riverines including the Pagli, Katalia, Dhonagoda, Matlab, and Udhamodi. All of these rivers rejoin the Meghna at different points downstream.

Near Bhola, just before flowing into the Bay of Bengal, the river again divides into two main streams in the Ganges delta and separates an island from both sides of the mainland. The western stream is called Ilsha while the eastern one is called Bamni. They form the largest delta in the world named the Ganges Delta.

== See also ==
- List of rivers in Bangladesh
