= Juri River =

River in India

Coordinates: 24°42′N 91°57′E

The Juri River is a trans-boundary river in India and Bangladesh. It rises in the Jampui Hills of the Indian state of Tripura. The Juri has a length of 79 kilometers. It crosses into Bangladesh in Juri Upazila of Maulvi Bazar District. The Juri Upazila is named after this river.

== See also ==
- List of rivers in Bangladesh
