= Gumti River (transboundary river) =

Gomati River
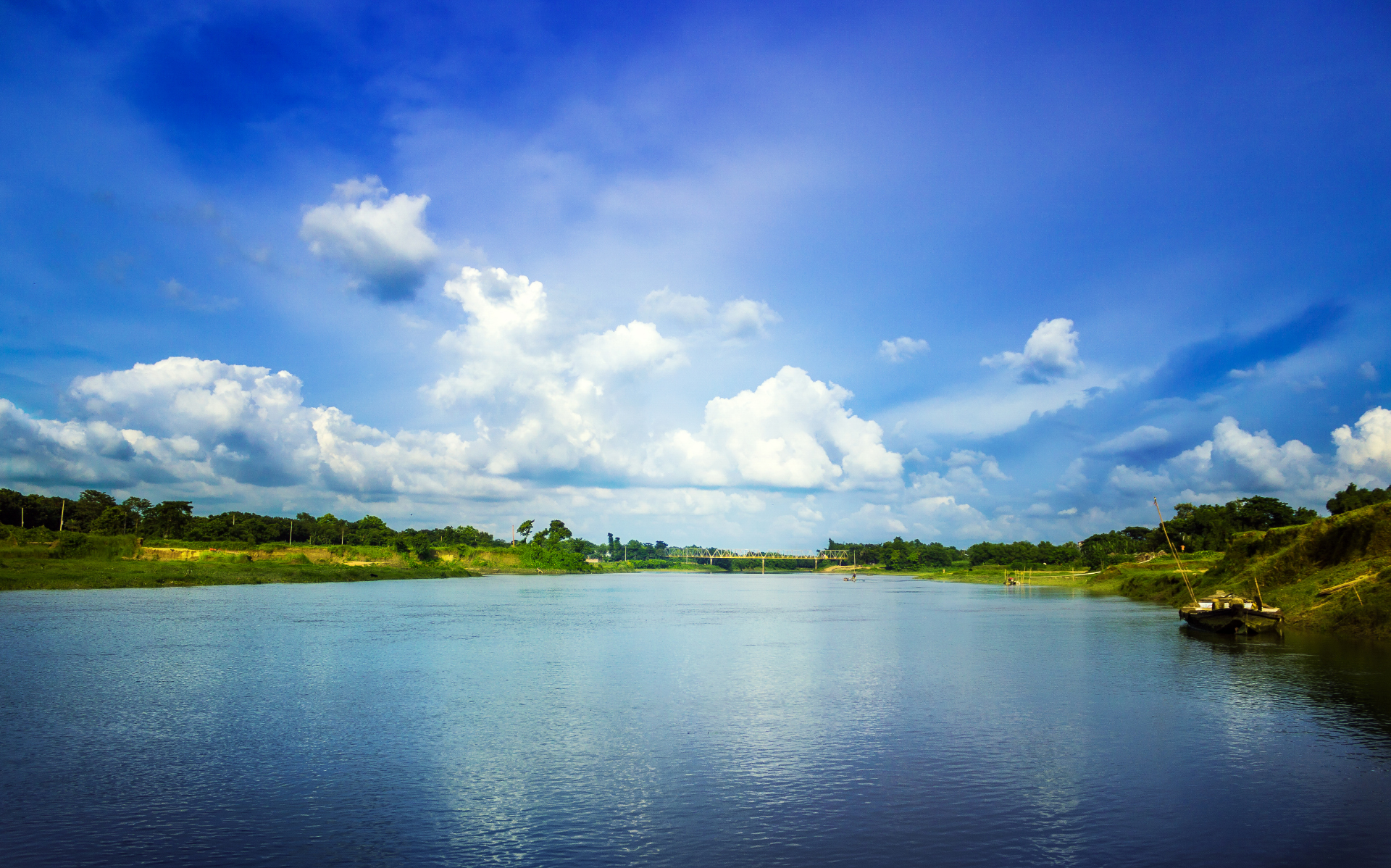
- Gomati river in Kaptan Bazar, Cumilla

- Location in Bangladesh
- Native name: গোমতী নদী (Bengali)

Location
- India: Tripura
- Bangladesh: Cumilla

Physical characteristics
- Source: Dumur, Tripura
- Mouth: Meghna River
  - coordinates: 23°31′46″N 90°42′08″E
- Length: 95 km (59 mi)

The Gomati or Gumti (Bengali: গোমতী, gomatī/gumtī) is a river flowing through the north-eastern Indian state of Tripura and the district of Cumilla in Bangladesh. In Tripura near Dumbur, a dam for the Gumti Hydroelectric Project has been constructed on the river that has formed a 40 square kilometres (15 mi^{2}) lake.

== Gallery ==
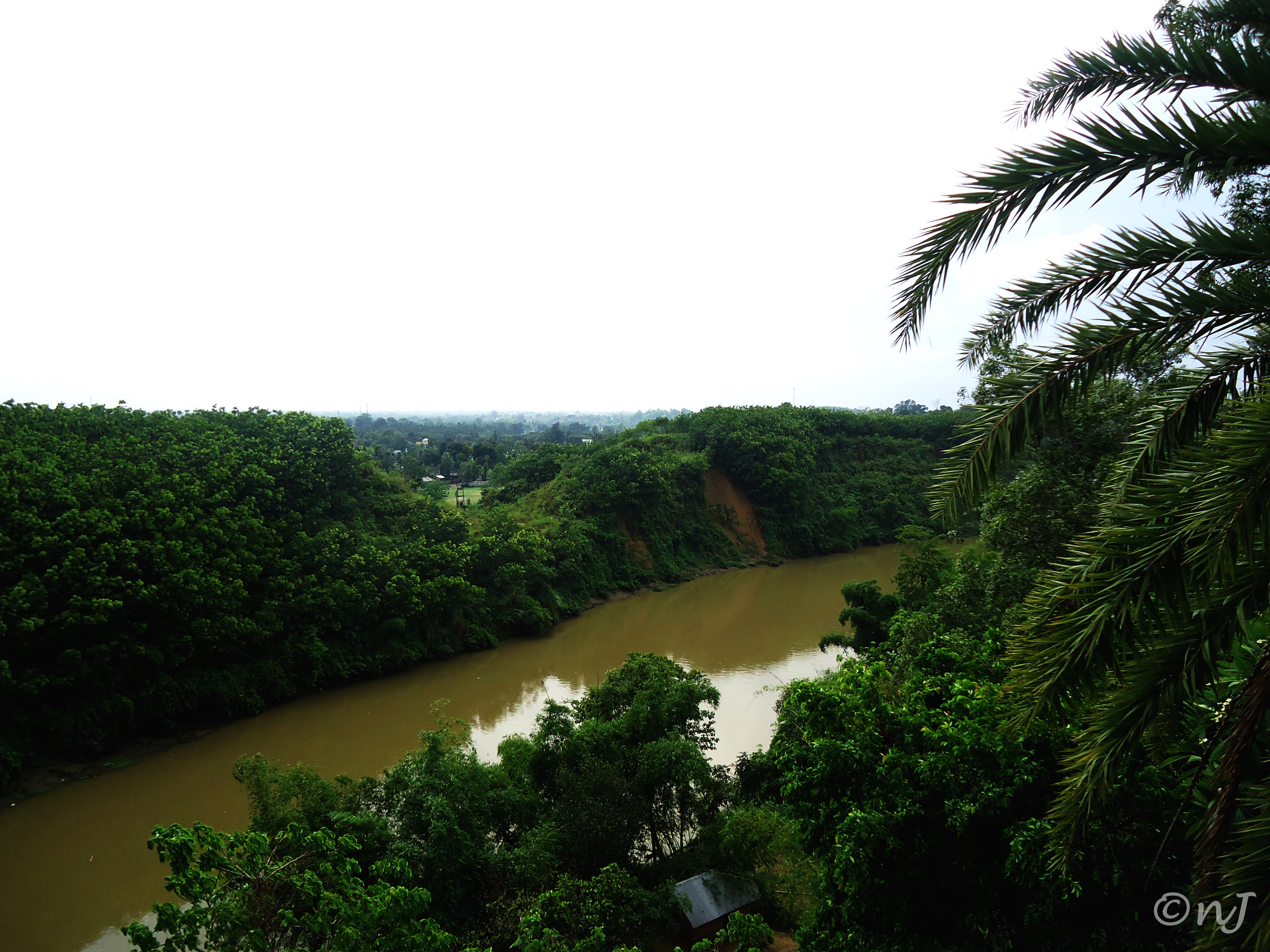
Gumti River flowing through Udaipur, Tripura

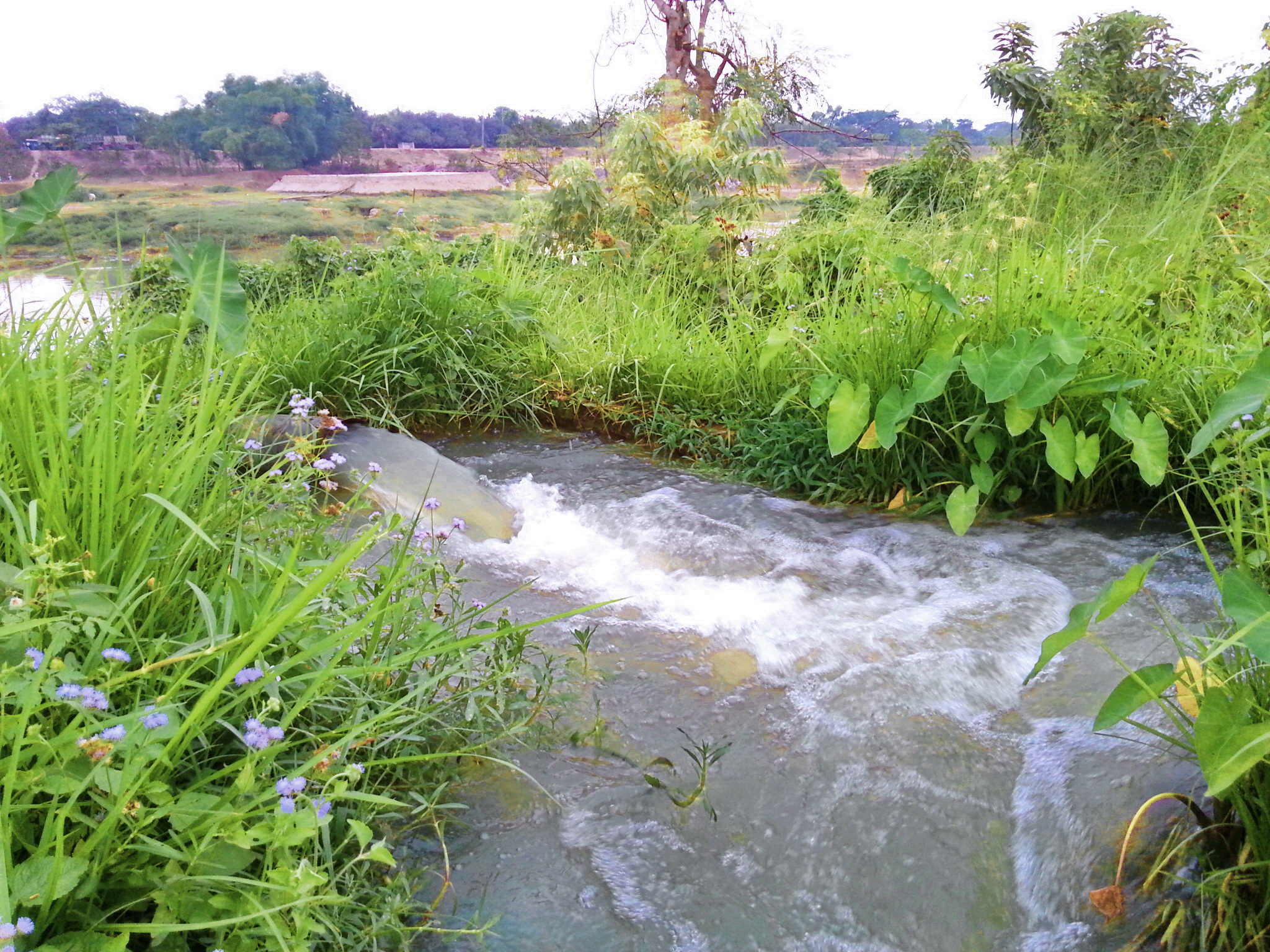
Irrigation is underway by pump-enabled extraction directly from the Gumti, seen in the background, in Cumilla, Bangladesh.

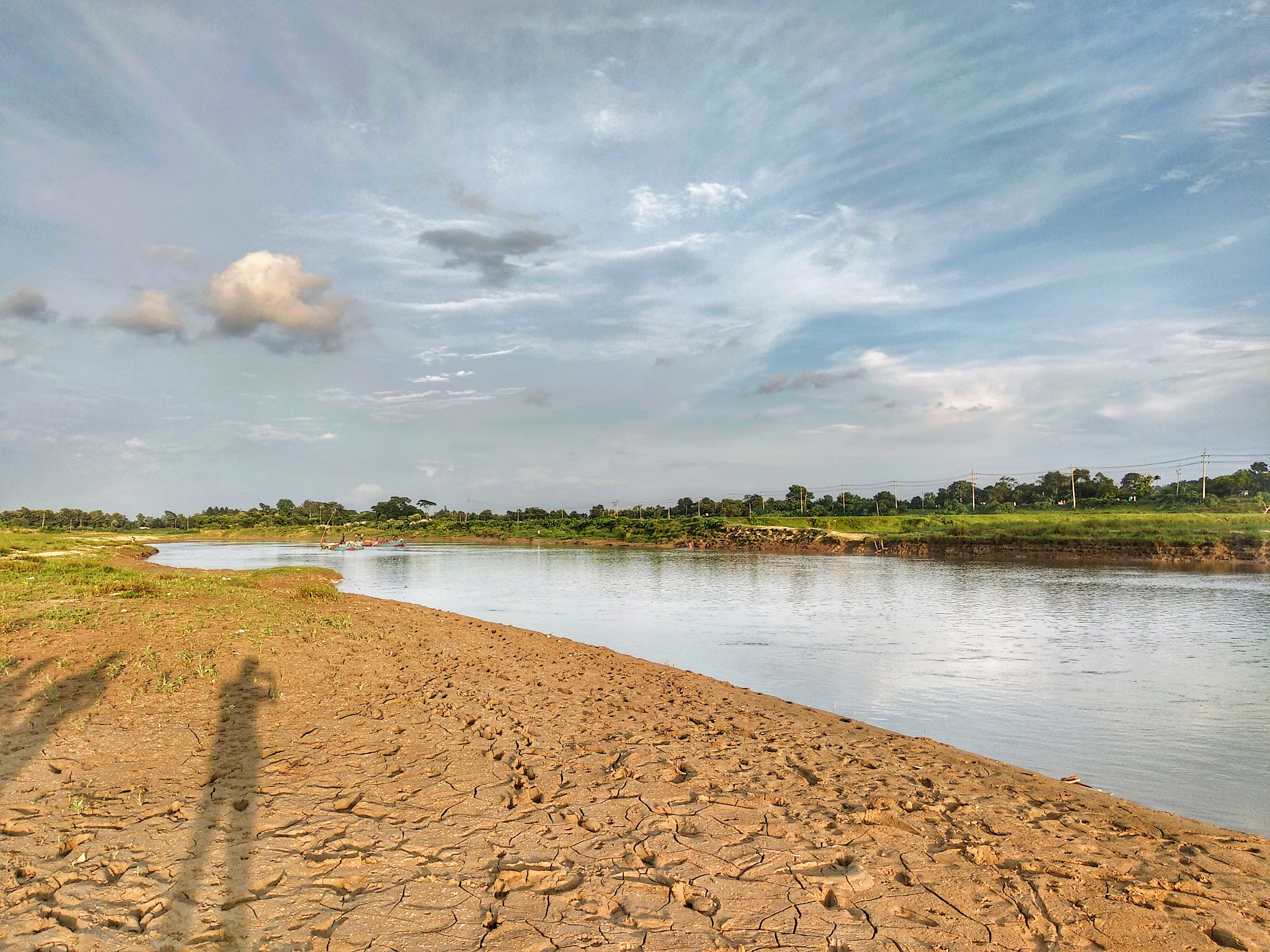

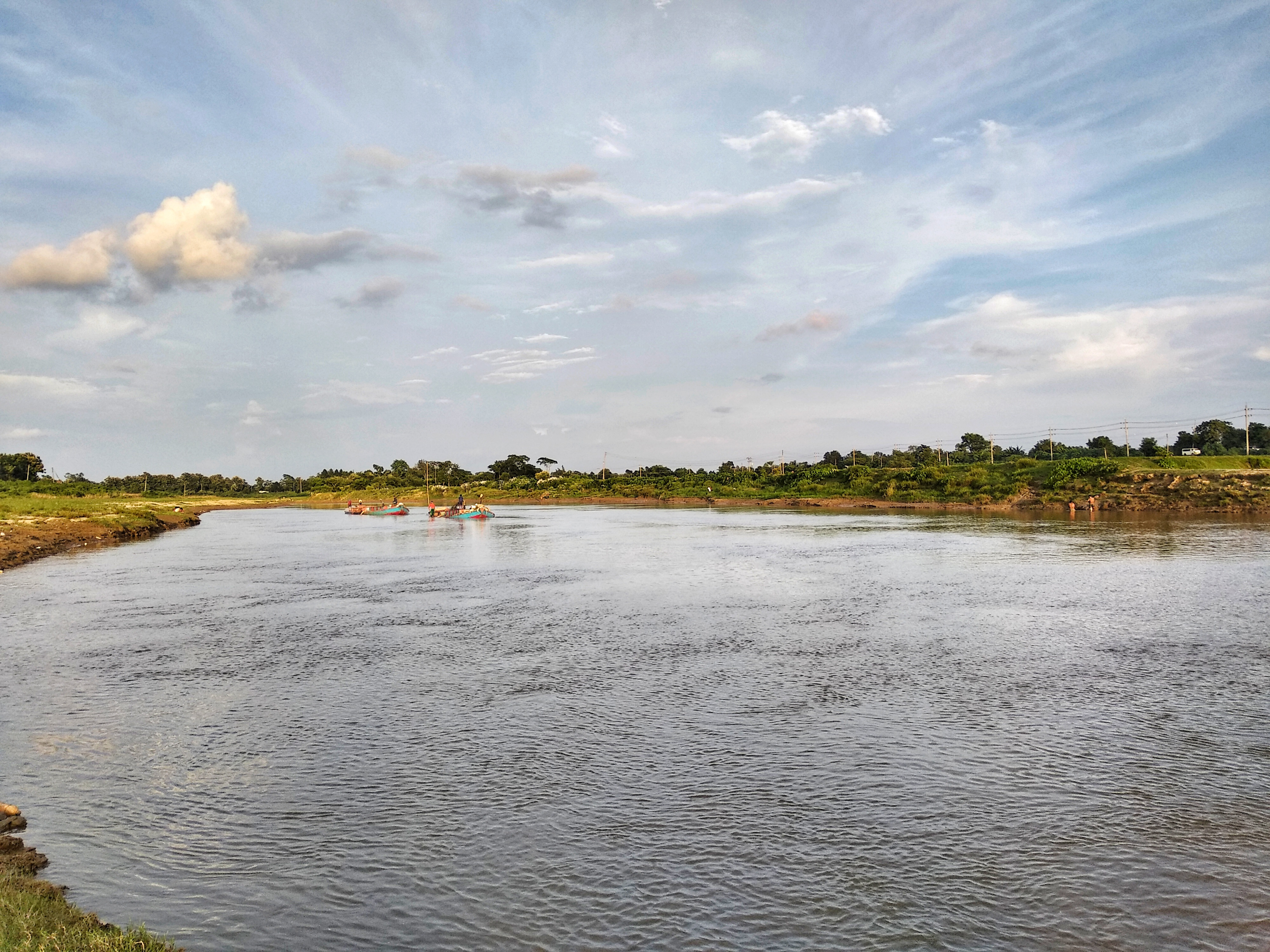

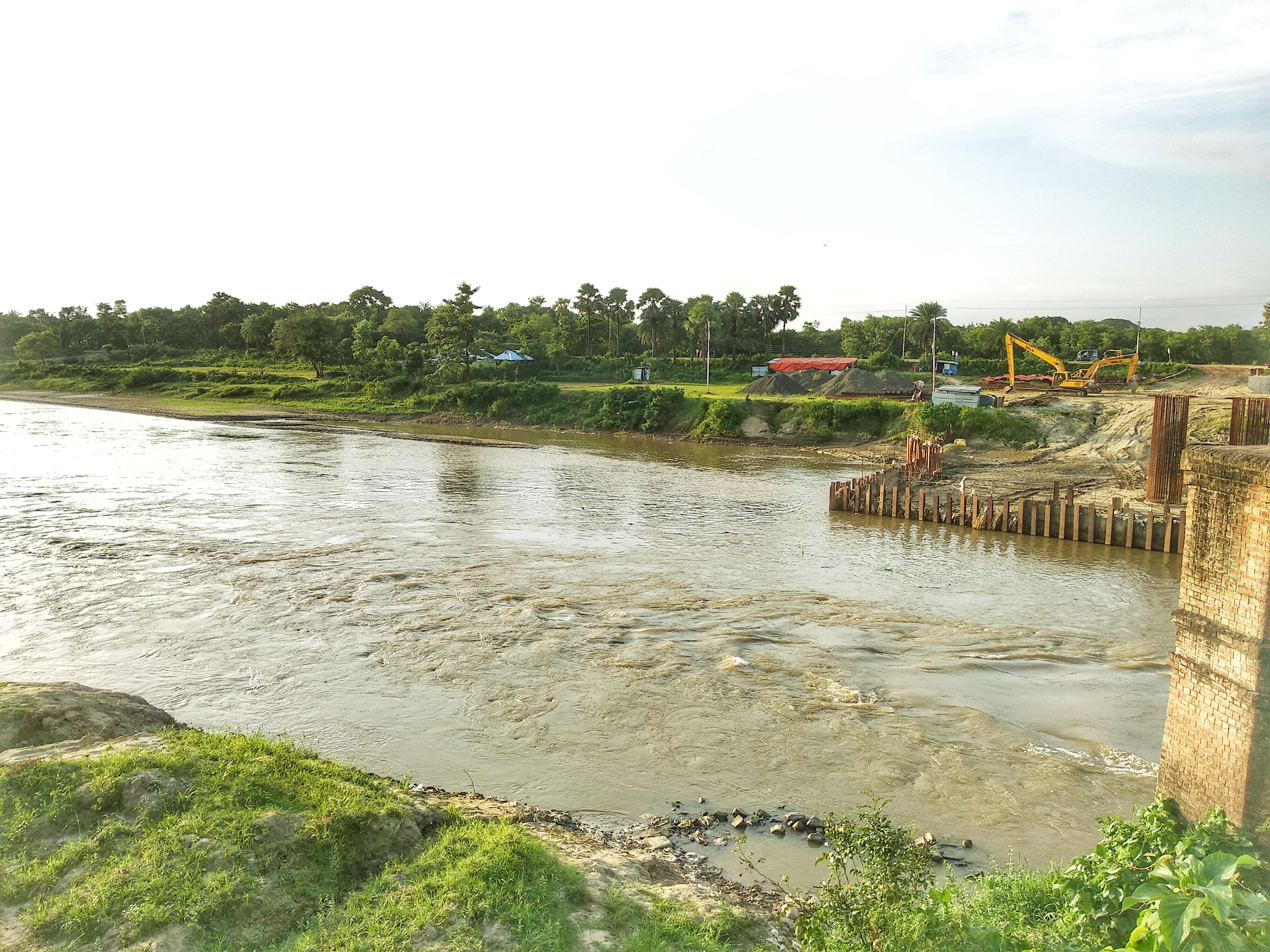

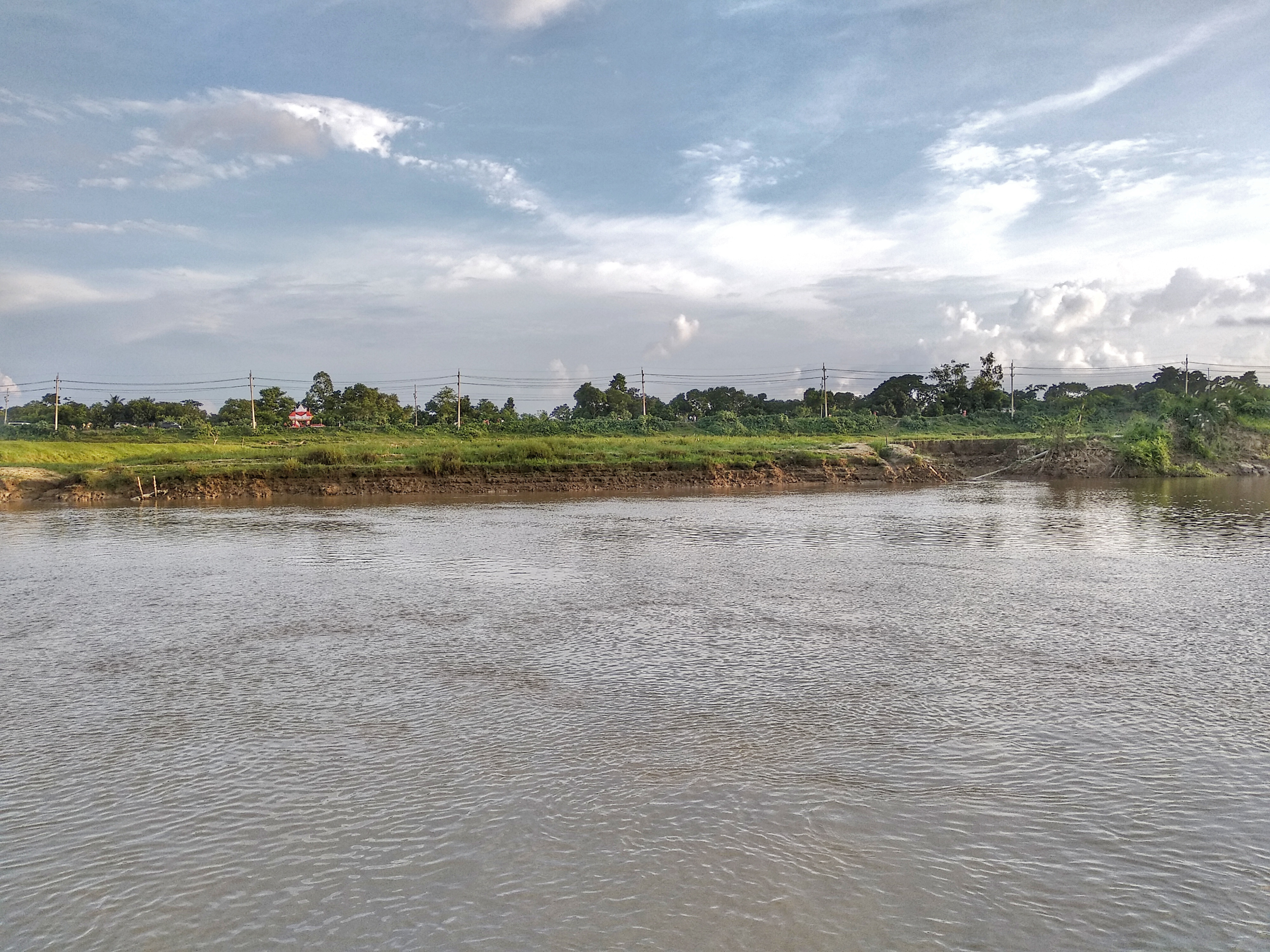

== See also ==
- Story of Python (Tripuri folktale)
