= Transboundary river =

River that crosses one or more political borders

A transboundary river is a river that crosses at least one political border, either a border within a state or an international boundary. Bangladesh has at least 58 major rivers that enter the country from the Republic of India, including two of the world's largest rivers, the Brahmaputra and the Ganges. The Naf River is the only river that flows via Bangladesh into Myanmar.

The hydrologic and political effects of rivers that cross significant boundaries are enormous. Rivers have positive effects in that they carry a significant amount of sediment, which aids in building land in estuarine regions. However, this sediment raises the height of riverbeds, thereby causing flooding. International conventions governing water sharing have led to complex political disputes.

== List of major international transboundary rivers ==
River	Length (km)	Countries
Amazon	6,500	Brazil; Colombia; Peru
Brahmaputra	3,848	Bangladesh; China; India
Colorado	2,333	Mexico; United States
Columbia	2,000	Canada; United States
Danube	2,860	Austria; Bulgaria; Croatia; Germany; Hungary; Moldova; Romania; Serbia; Slovakia; Ukraine
Daugava	1,020	Belarus; Latvia; Russia
Dnipro	2,200	Belarus; Russia; Ukraine
Euphrates	2,800	Iraq; Syria; Turkey
Ganges	3,084	Bangladesh; India
Ichamati	334	Bangladesh; India
Indus	3,500	China; India; Pakistan
Irrawaddy	2,210	China; Myanmar
Mekong	4,350	Cambodia; China; Laos; Myanmar; Thailand; Vietnam
Meuse	925	Belgium; France; Netherlands
Niger	4,180	Benin; Guinea; Mali; Niger; Nigeria
Nile	7,088	Burundi; DR Congo; Egypt; Eritrea; Ethiopia; Kenya; Rwanda; South Sudan; Sudan; Tanzania; Uganda
Rhine	1,230	Austria; France; Germany; Liechtenstein; Netherlands; Switzerland
Rhône	813	France; Switzerland
Rio Grande	3,051	Mexico; United States
St. Lawrence	500	Canada; United States
Tagus	1,007	Portugal; Spain
Tigris	1,850	Iraq; Syria; Turkey
Yukon	3,190	Canada; United States
Zambezi	2,474	Angola; Botswana; Mozambique; Namibia; Zambia; Zimbabwe

== See also ==
- List of Bangladesh-India transboundary rivers
- List of international river borders
