= Lists of rivers =

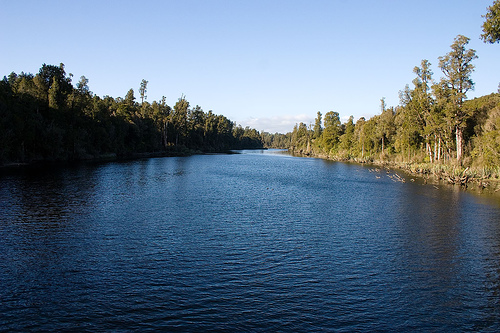
The Arnold River, Moana, New Zealand

This is a comprehensive list of rivers, organized primarily by continent and country.

== General lists ==
- List of drainage basins by area (including rivers, lakes, and endorheic basins)
- List of largest unfragmented rivers
- List of longest undammed rivers
- List of river name etymologies
- List of rivers by age
- List of rivers by discharge
- List of rivers by length
- List of rivers of Central America and the Caribbean
- List of rivers of the Americas
- List of rivers of the Americas by coastline
- List of river films and television series

== Rivers of Africa ==
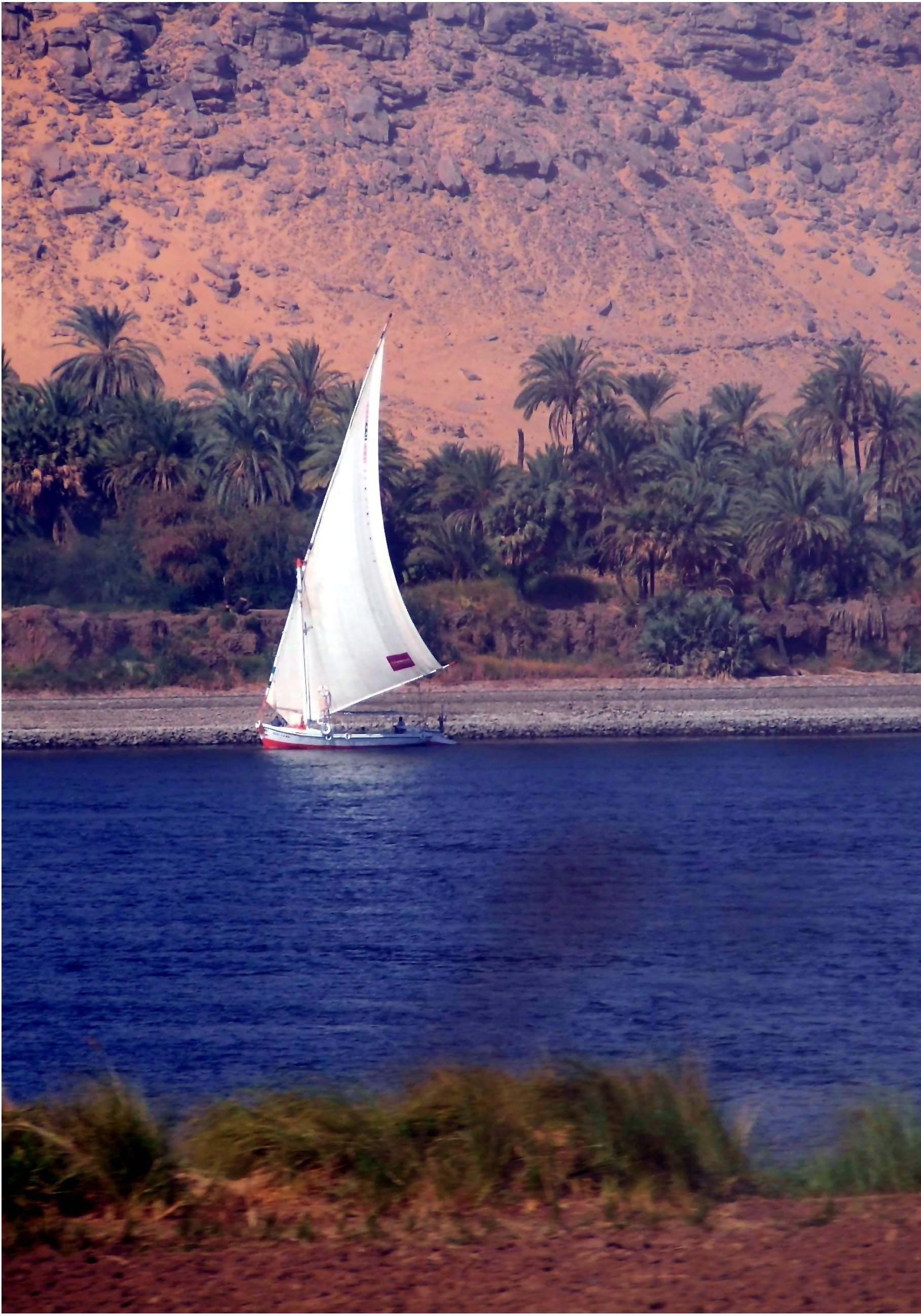
A dhow traversing the Nile near Aswan, Egypt

=== Rivers of East Africa ===
- List of rivers of Burundi
- List of wadis of Djibouti
- List of rivers of Eritrea
- List of rivers of Ethiopia
- List of rivers of Kenya
- List of rivers of Madagascar
- List of rivers of Malawi
- List of rivers of Mauritius
- List of rivers of Mozambique
- List of rivers of Réunion
- List of rivers of Rwanda
- List of rivers of Seychelles
- List of rivers of Somalia
- List of rivers of South Sudan
- List of rivers of Tanzania
- List of rivers of Uganda
- List of rivers of Zambia
- List of rivers of Zimbabwe

=== Rivers of Middle Africa ===
- List of rivers of Angola
- List of rivers of Cameroon
- List of rivers of the Central African Republic
- List of rivers of Chad
- List of rivers of the Republic of the Congo
- List of rivers of DR Congo
- List of rivers of Equatorial Guinea
- List of rivers of Gabon
- List of rivers of São Tomé and Príncipe

=== Rivers of Northern Africa ===
- List of rivers of Algeria
- List of rivers of Egypt
- List of wadis of Libya
- List of rivers of Morocco
- List of rivers of Sudan
- List of rivers of Tunisia
- List of rivers in Western Sahara

=== Rivers of Southern Africa ===
- List of rivers of Botswana
- List of rivers of Eswatini
- List of rivers of Lesotho
- List of rivers of Namibia
- List of rivers of South Africa

=== Rivers of Western Africa ===
- List of rivers of Benin
- List of rivers of Burkina Faso
- List of streams of Cape Verde
- List of rivers of the Gambia
- List of rivers of Ghana
- List of rivers of Guinea
- List of rivers of Guinea-Bissau
- List of rivers of Ivory Coast
- List of rivers of Liberia
- List of rivers of Mali
- List of rivers of Mauritania
- List of rivers of Niger
- List of rivers of Nigeria
- List of rivers of Senegal
- List of rivers of Sierra Leone
- List of rivers of Togo

== Rivers of Antarctica ==
- List of rivers of Antarctica

== Rivers of Asia ==
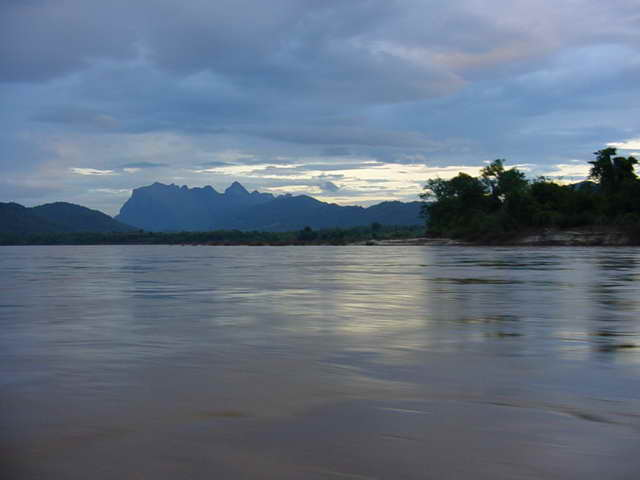
The Mekong before sunset, Thailand.

=== Rivers of Central Asia ===
- List of rivers of Afghanistan
- List of rivers of Kazakhstan
- List of rivers of Kyrgyzstan
- List of rivers of Tajikistan
- List of rivers of Turkmenistan
- List of rivers of Uzbekistan

=== Rivers of Eastern Asia ===
- List of rivers of China
  - List of rivers of Hong Kong
- List of rivers of Japan
- List of rivers of Korea
  - List of rivers of North Korea
  - List of rivers of South Korea
- List of rivers of Mongolia
- List of rivers of Taiwan

=== Rivers of Northern Asia ===
- List of rivers of Russia

=== Rivers of South-eastern Asia ===
- List of rivers of Brunei
- List of rivers of Cambodia
- List of rivers of East Timor
- List of rivers of Indonesia
- List of rivers of Laos
- List of rivers of Malaysia
- List of rivers of Myanmar
- List of rivers of the Philippines
- List of rivers of Singapore
- List of rivers of Thailand
- List of rivers of Vietnam

=== Rivers of Southern Asia ===
- List of Bangladesh–India transboundary rivers
- List of rivers of Afghanistan
- List of rivers of Bangladesh
- List of rivers of Bhutan
- List of rivers of India
  - List of rivers of India by discharge
- List of rivers of Iran
- List of rivers of Nepal
- List of rivers of Pakistan
- List of rivers of Sri Lanka

==== Rivers of India by state ====
- List of rivers of Andhra Pradesh
- List of rivers of Assam
- List of rivers of Dakshina Kannada and Udupi districts
- List of rivers of Gujarat
- List of rivers of Jharkhand
- List of rivers of Kerala
- List of rivers of Madhya Pradesh
- List of rivers of Odisha
- List of rivers of Puducherry
- List of rivers of Rajasthan
- List of rivers of Tamil Nadu
- List of rivers of Tripura
- List of rivers of West Bengal
  - List of rivers of Nadia

=== Rivers of Western Asia ===
- List of rivers of Armenia
- List of rivers of Azerbaijan
- List of rivers of Cyprus
- List of rivers of Georgia
- List of rivers of Iran
- List of rivers of Iraq
- List of rivers of Israel
- List of rivers of Jordan
- List of rivers of Lebanon
- List of rivers of Palestine
- List of rivers of Syria
- List of rivers of Turkey
- List of wadis of Kuwait
- List of wadis of Oman
- List of wadis of Qatar
- List of wadis of Saudi Arabia
- List of wadis of the United Arab Emirates
- List of wadis of Yemen

== Rivers of Europe ==
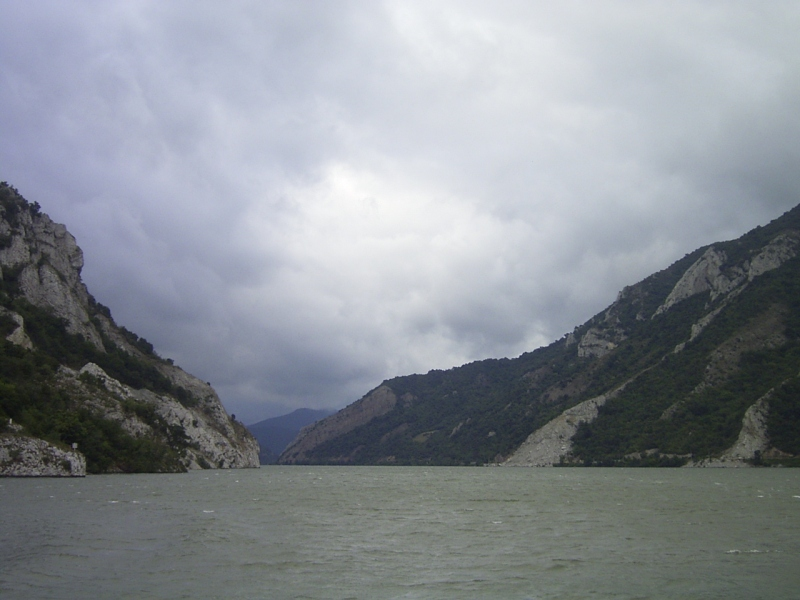
The Iron Gates on the Danube.

=== General lists ===
- List of European rivers with alternative names
- List of rivers discharging into the North Sea
- List of rivers of the Baltic Sea

=== Rivers of Eastern Europe ===
- List of rivers of Armenia
- List of rivers of Azerbaijan
- List of rivers of Belarus
- List of rivers of Bulgaria
- List of rivers of the Czech Republic
- List of rivers of Georgia
- List of rivers of Hungary
- List of rivers of Latvia
- List of rivers of Moldova
- List of rivers of Poland
- List of rivers of Kazakhstan
- List of rivers of Romania
- List of rivers of Russia
- List of rivers of Slovakia
- List of rivers of Ukraine

=== Rivers of Northern Europe ===
- List of rivers of Denmark
- List of rivers of Estonia
- List of rivers of Finland
- List of rivers of Iceland
- List of rivers of Ireland
- List of rivers of the Isle of Man
- List of rivers of Lithuania
- List of rivers of Norway
- List of rivers of Sweden
- List of rivers of the United Kingdom
  - List of rivers of England
  - List of rivers of Northern Ireland
  - List of rivers of Scotland
  - List of rivers of Wales

=== Rivers of Southern Europe ===
- List of rivers of Albania
- List of rivers of Bosnia and Herzegovina
- List of rivers of Croatia
- List of rivers of Cyprus
- List of rivers of Greece
- List of rivers of Italy
- List of rivers of Montenegro
- List of rivers of North Macedonia
- List of rivers of Portugal
- List of rivers of Serbia
- List of rivers of Slovenia
- List of rivers of Spain
  - List of rivers of Catalonia
  - List of rivers of Galicia
- List of rivers of Turkey
- List of streams of Malta

=== Rivers of Western Europe ===
- List of rivers of Austria
- List of rivers of Belgium
- List of rivers of France
- List of rivers of Germany
- List of rivers of Liechtenstein
- List of rivers of Luxembourg
- List of rivers of the Netherlands
- List of rivers of Switzerland

== Rivers of North America ==
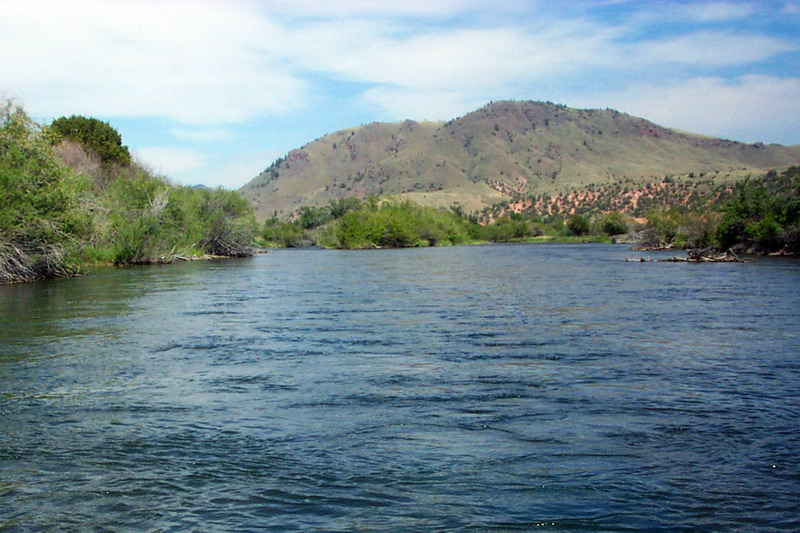
Beaverhead River, a tributary of the Jefferson River and a headwater of the Missouri River, Montana

=== Rivers of the Caribbean ===
- List of creeks of The Bahamas
- List of rivers of Antigua and Barbuda
- List of rivers of Barbados
- List of rivers of Cuba
- List of rivers of Dominica
- List of rivers of the Dominican Republic
- List of rivers of Grenada
- List of rivers of Guadeloupe
- List of rivers of Haiti
- List of rivers of Jamaica
- List of rivers of Martinique
- List of rivers of Montserrat
- List of rivers of Puerto Rico
- List of rivers of Saint Kitts and Nevis
- List of rivers of Saint Lucia
- List of rivers of Saint Martin (France)
- List of rivers of Saint Pierre and Miquelon
- List of rivers of Saint Vincent and the Grenadines
- List of rivers of Trinidad and Tobago
- List of rivers of the United States Virgin Islands
- List of streams of the Dutch Caribbean
  - List of streams of Aruba

=== Rivers of Central America ===
- List of rivers of Belize
- List of rivers of Costa Rica
- List of rivers of El Salvador
- List of rivers of Guatemala
- List of rivers of Honduras
- List of rivers of Mexico
- List of rivers of Nicaragua
- List of rivers of Panama

=== Rivers of Northern America ===
==== Rivers of Canada ====
- List of rivers of Alberta
- List of rivers of British Columbia
- List of rivers of Manitoba
- List of rivers of New Brunswick
- List of rivers of Newfoundland and Labrador
- List of rivers of the Northwest Territories
- List of rivers of Nova Scotia
- List of rivers of Nunavut
- List of rivers of Ontario
- List of rivers of Prince Edward Island
- List of rivers of Quebec
- List of rivers of Saskatchewan
- List of rivers of Yukon

==== Rivers of Greenland ====
- List of rivers of Greenland

==== Rivers of the United States ====
===== General lists =====
- List of longest rivers of the United States
- List of longest rivers in the United States by state
- List of rivers of the Great Basin
- List of rivers of the Rocky Mountains
- List of U.S. rivers by discharge
- List of watercourses in the San Francisco Bay Area

===== Rivers of the United States by state =====
- List of rivers of Alabama
- List of rivers of Alaska
- List of rivers of Arizona
- List of rivers of Arkansas
- List of rivers of California
- List of rivers of Colorado
- List of rivers of Connecticut
- List of rivers of Delaware
- List of rivers of Florida
- List of rivers of Georgia
- List of rivers of Hawaii
- List of rivers of Idaho
- List of rivers of Illinois
- List of rivers of Indiana
- List of rivers of Iowa
- List of rivers of Kansas
- List of rivers of Kentucky
- List of rivers of Louisiana
- List of rivers of Maine
- List of rivers of Maryland
- List of rivers of Massachusetts
- List of rivers of Michigan
- List of rivers of Minnesota
- List of rivers of Mississippi
- List of rivers of Missouri
- List of rivers of Montana
- List of rivers of Nebraska
- List of rivers of Nevada
- List of rivers of New Hampshire
- List of rivers of New Jersey
- List of rivers of New Mexico
- List of rivers of New York
- List of rivers of North Carolina
- List of rivers of North Dakota
- List of rivers of Ohio
- List of rivers of Oklahoma
- List of rivers of Oregon
- List of rivers of Pennsylvania
- List of rivers of Rhode Island
- List of rivers of South Carolina
- List of rivers of South Dakota
- List of rivers of Tennessee
- List of rivers of Texas
- List of rivers of Utah
- List of rivers of Vermont
- List of rivers of Virginia
- List of rivers of Washington (state)
- List of rivers of Washington, D.C.
- List of rivers of West Virginia
- List of rivers of Wisconsin
- List of rivers of Wyoming

== Rivers of Oceania ==
- List of rivers of Australia
  - List of rivers of New South Wales (A–K)
  - List of rivers of New South Wales (L–Z)
  - List of rivers of Tasmania
- List of rivers of Guam
- List of rivers of Hawaii
- List of rivers of the Federated States of Micronesia
- List of rivers of New Zealand
  - List of rivers of the Marlborough Region
  - List of rivers of New Zealand by length
- List of rivers of Papua New Guinea

== Rivers of South America ==
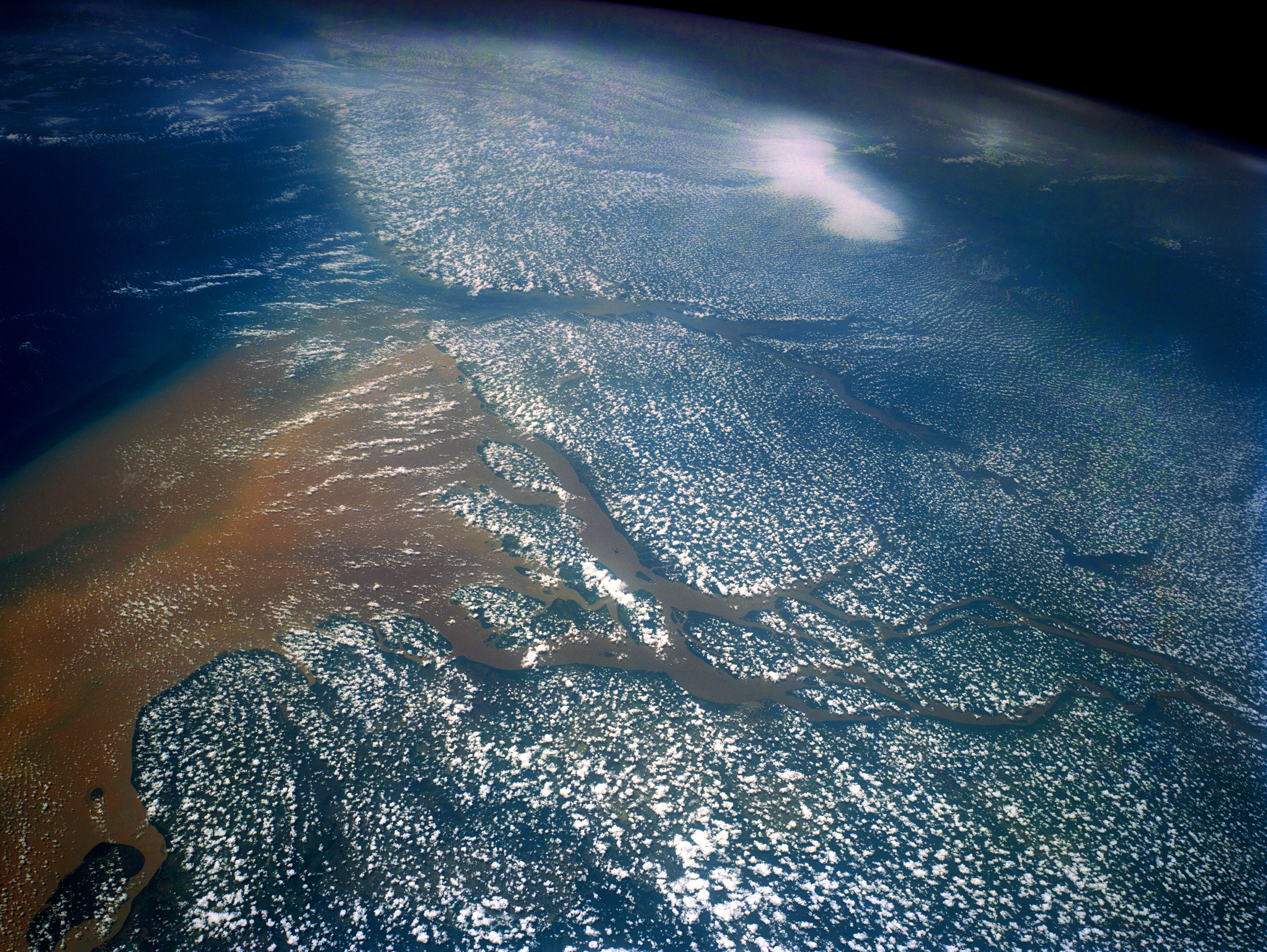
A satellite image of the mouth of the Amazon River

- List of rivers of Argentina
  - List of rivers of Mendoza Province
- List of rivers of Bolivia
- List of rivers of Brazil
- List of rivers of Chile
- List of rivers of Colombia
- List of rivers of Ecuador
- List of rivers of the Falkland Islands
- List of rivers of French Guiana
- List of rivers of Guyana
- List of rivers of Paraguay
- List of rivers of Peru
- List of rivers of Suriname
- List of rivers of Uruguay
- List of rivers of Venezuela

== See also ==
- List of rivers on Titan
