= List of rivers of Equatorial Guinea =

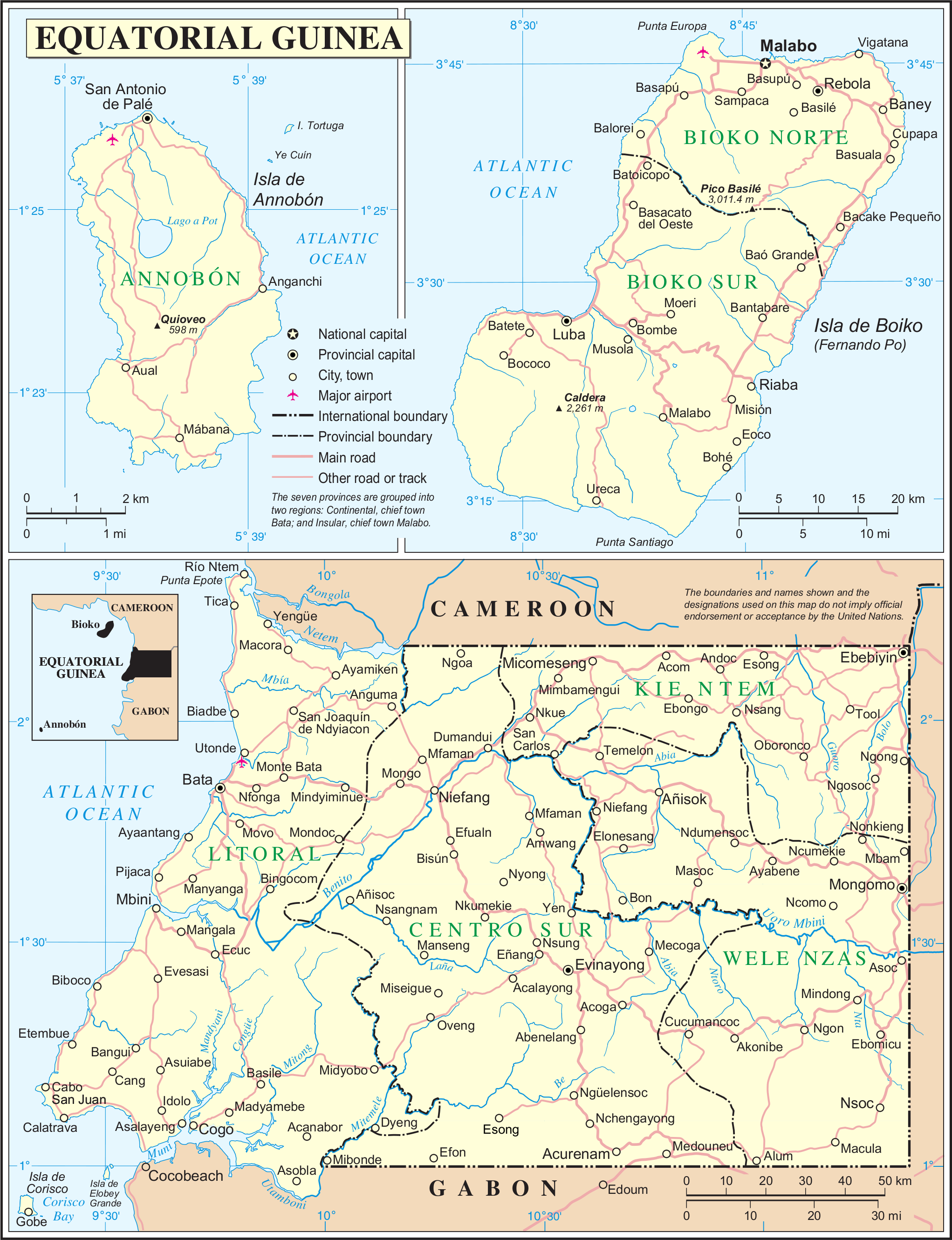
Map of Equatorial Guinea showing the main rivers and tributaries.

This is a list of rivers in Equatorial Guinea. This list is arranged by drainage basin, with respective tributaries indented under each larger stream's name.

== Mainland ==
- Campo River (Ntem River)
  - Guoro River
  - Kyé River
    - Bolo River
- Mbia River
- Benito River (Mbini River)
  - Laña River
  - Abia River (lower Benito River)
  - Abia River (upper Benito River)
  - Mtoro River
  - Nta River
- Muni River
  - Mandyani River
    - Congue River
  - Mitong River
  - Mven River
  - Utamboni River
    - Mitemele River
      - Midyobo River
      - Be River
- Komo River
  - Mbeya River
- Ogooué River (Gabon)
  - Abanga River
    - Nkan River

== Bioko Island ==
- Río Bosecabosechi
- Río Cónsul
- Río Suhu
- Río Sochi
- Río Ruma
- Río Iladyi
- Río Moaba
- Río Maloho
- Río Apú
