= Manuel Iradier =

Manuel Iradier y Bulfi
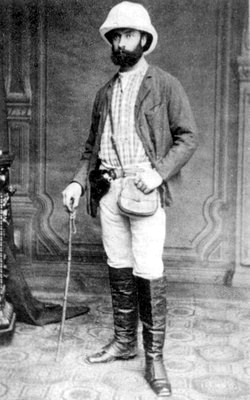
- Journalist and explorer
- Born: Manuel Iradier y Bulfi; 6 July 1854; Vitoria-Gasteiz, Álava, Spain
- Died: 19 July 1911 (aged 57); Valsain, Segovia, Spain

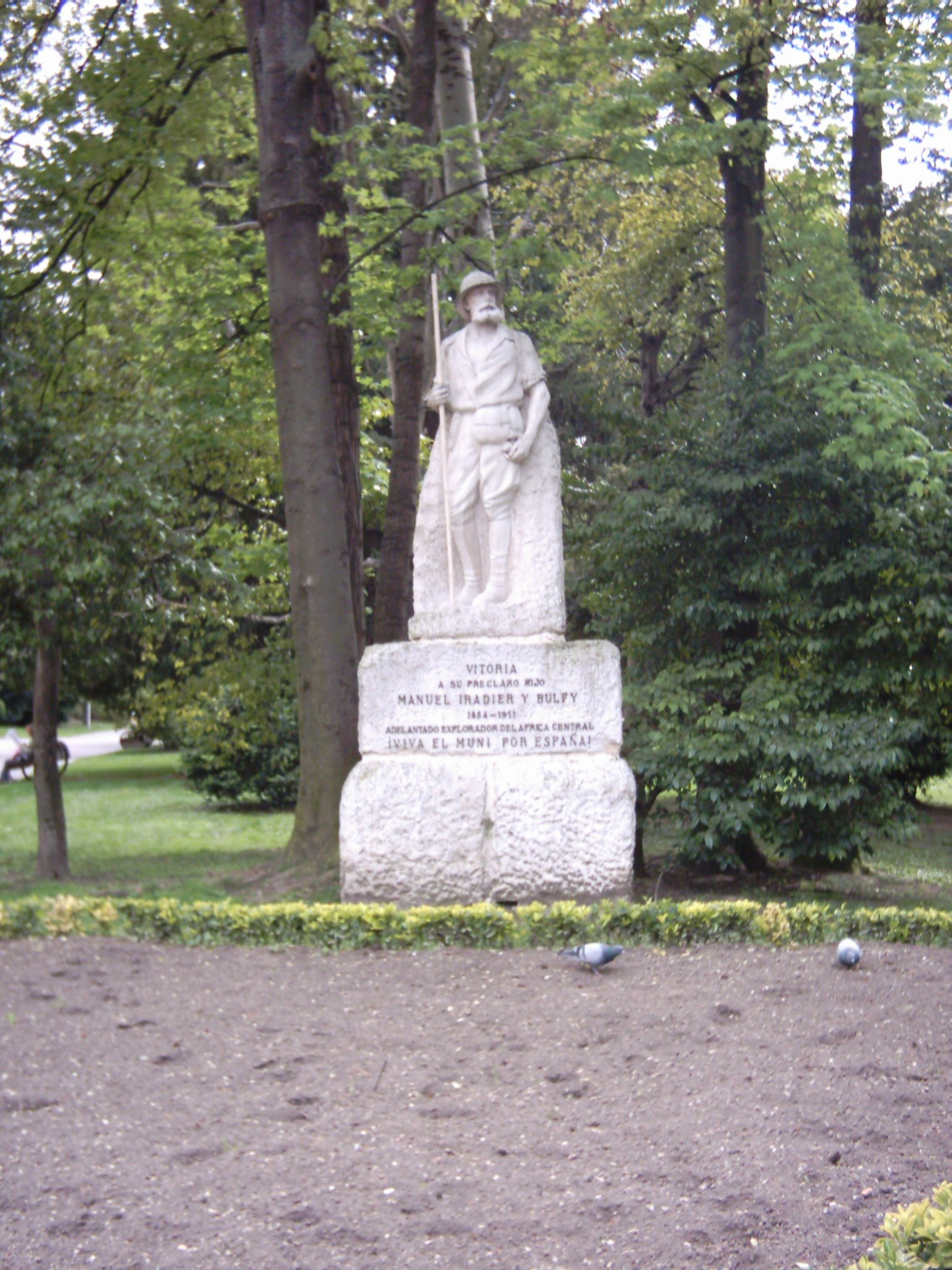
Statue of Manuel Iradier in Vitoria

Manuel Iradier y Bulfi (b. Vitoria, 1854–1911) was a Spanish explorer of Africa. A student of philosophy and literature, he fell under the influence of Henry Morton Stanley and turned to exploration.

== History ==
Iradier was born in Spain in 1854. From an early age, he was a voracious reader of Victorian explorer books. From 1868 to 1874 he made preparations for an expedition to Africa. He founded a company to aid collaboration with others who had the same interests.

=== First Expedition ===
In 1874 he made his initial preparatory trip to the Gulf of Guinea, from where he planned to proceed towards the interior. During the expedition, Iradier – accompanied by his wife, sister-in-law and others, traveled almost 1,900 kilometres (1,200 mi) from Aye up to the Muni River. In the course of the journey his wife gave birth to daughter Isabel.

He followed the Utamboni river in an attempt to reach the Great Lakes and the mouth of the Muni.

The expedition reached the islands of Corisco and Elobey Grande, as well as Inguinna and San Juan, the Utongo and Bathe rivers, as well as the Paluviole and the Saw of Crystal mountain ranges. The expedition had to turn back when the majority of the indigenous escort absconded.

Isabel died in the course of the expedition.

Iradier mapped the regions he had visited and, on his return to Spain, these were published by the Company of Africanists and Colonistas of Madrid.

=== Second Expedition ===
His second expedition began at the end of 1877 during which he recorded vocabularies and grammars of the languages of the tribes he encountered, as well as numerous astronomic, ethnographic, climatological and commercial observations.

=== Third Expedition ===
The company funded a third expedition that departed in July 1884. Iradier was accompanied by Dr. Ossorio, who participated as the delegate of the Africanists' Company. The trip crossed the territories he had already explored and reached the navigable limit of the river Utongo, from there following the Cóngue river up to the river Muni, down which they descended to coasts of the Buru, on the North-East of Corisco's Bay. Suffering from a high-fever and unable to continue, Iradier returned to Spain, arriving on 28 November 1884.

In February 1885 he submitted to the Company of Africanists and Colonists of Madrid various documents, contracts of annexation and notarial deeds, incorporating the territories of the river Muni under Spanish sovereignty. Purportedly such sovereignty had been acknowledged by 101 indigenous leaders, covering an area of 14.000 square kilometres. These territories, known later as Spanish Guinea, remained under Spanish sovereignty until 1968.

== Published works ==
Iradier published numerous works in which he documented his African experiences. His first text, Fragmentos de un viaje de exploración en la zona de Corisco was published in 1878.

== See also ==
- Isabel de Urquiola, his wife
