= List of countries and dependencies without rivers =

There are currently 17 countries and 21 territories that do not have a permanent natural river flowing within them, though some of them have streams or seasonal watercourses such as wadis.

The countries in the Arabian Peninsula, with the exception of Oman, is the largest subregion in the world without any permanent natural river. Countries in this subregion have wadis instead.

== Sovereign states ==
=== Africa ===
- Djibouti (See List of wadis of Djibouti)
- Libya (See List of wadis of Libya)

=== Asia ===
- Kuwait (See List of wadis of Kuwait)
- Maldives
- Qatar (See List of wadis of Qatar)
- Saudi Arabia (See List of wadis of Saudi Arabia)
- United Arab Emirates (See List of wadis of the United Arab Emirates)
- Yemen (See List of wadis of Yemen)
- Bahrain

=== Europe ===
- Malta (See List of valleys of Malta)
- Liechtenstein
- Monaco
- Vatican City

=== Oceania ===
- Kiribati
- Marshall Islands
- Nauru
- Tonga
- Tuvalu

== Dependencies and other territories ==
=== Asia ===
- British Indian Ocean Territory
- Macau

=== The Americas ===
- Anguilla
- Aruba
- Bermuda
- Bonaire
- Cayman Islands
- Curaçao
- Saba
- Saint Barthélemy
- Saint Martin
- Sint Eustatius
- Sint Maarten
- Turks and Caicos Islands

=== Oceania ===
- Christmas Island
- Cocos Islands
- Easter Island
- Niue
- Norfolk Island
- Pitcairn Islands
- Tokelau

== See also ==
- Lists of rivers
