= International rankings of Armenia =

The following are international rankings of Armenia

== Demographics ==
- United Nations: Population, ranked 136 out of 242 countries
- CIA World Factbook: Urbanization ranked 80 out of 194 countries

== Economy ==
- World Economic Forum's Global Competitiveness Report 2011-2012, ranked 92 out of 142 countries.
- World Bank: Ease of Doing Business Index 2011, ranked 48 out of 183 countries
- International Monetary Fund: GDP per capita 2011, ranked 116 out of 182 countries
- The Wall Street Journal and The Heritage Foundation: Index of Economic Freedom 2012, ranked 39 out of 179 countries
- CIA World Factbook: GDP per capita 2011, ranked 117 out of 192 countries
- International Monetary Fund: GDP per capita 2011, ranked 122 out of 185
- World Bank: GDP per capita 2011, ranked 120 out of 190

== Geography ==
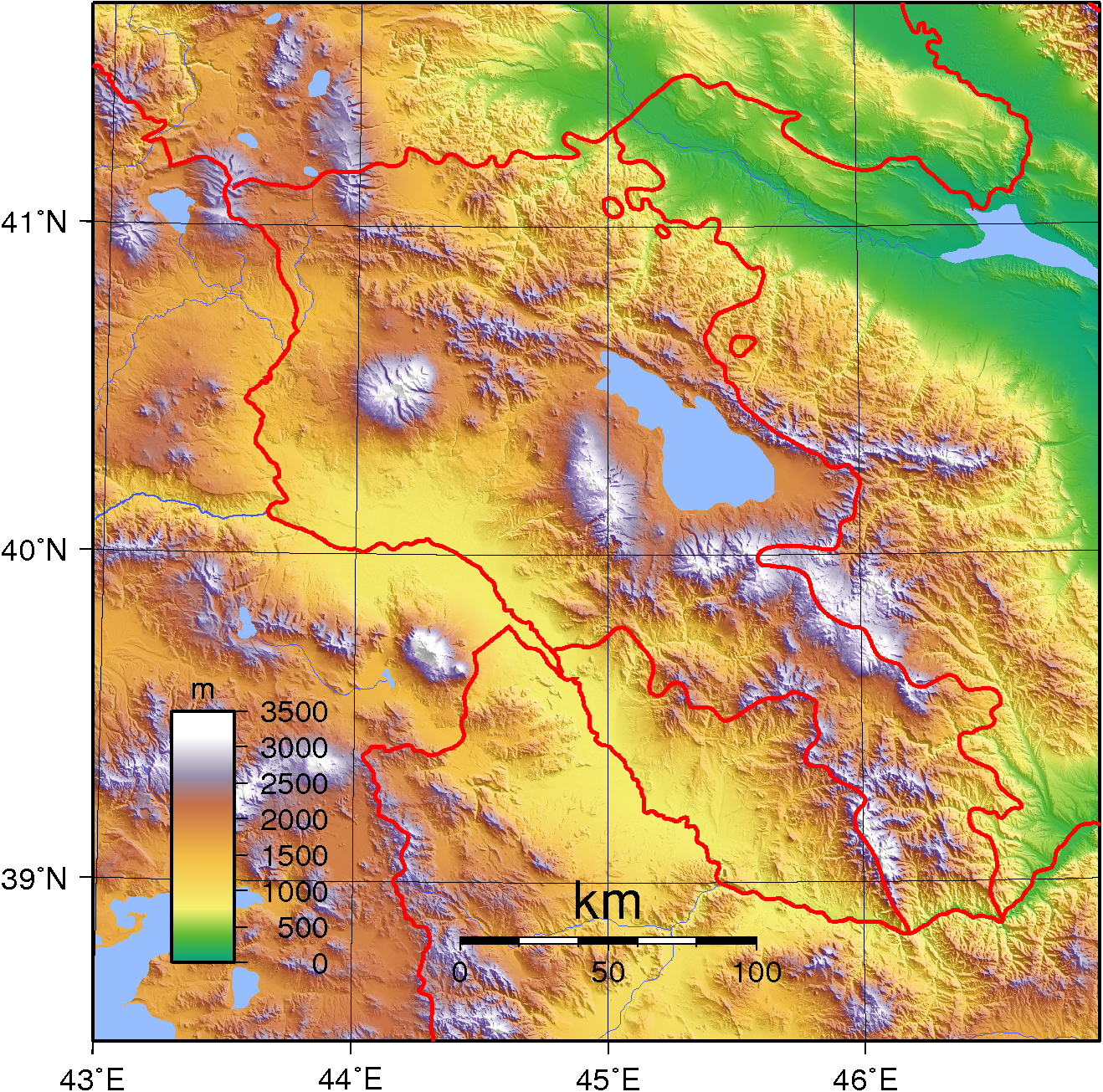
Armenia's topography is mountainous and volcanic

- Total area ranked 141 out of 233 countries and outlying territories
- Renewable water resources as of 1997, ranked 136 out of 174 countries

== Military ==
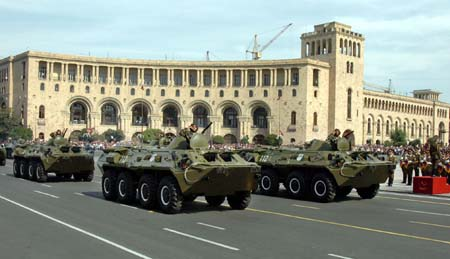
Armenian Army BTR-80s

- Military expenditures ranked 84 out of 171 countries
- CIA World Factbook: Military expenditures ratio to GDP, ranked 49 out of 172 countries
- Institute for Economics and Peace 2012 Global Peace Index ranked 115 out of 158

== Politics ==
- Transparency International: 2012 Corruption Perceptions Index, ranked 105 out of 174 countries
- Reporters Without Borders: 2011-2012 Press Freedom Index, ranked 77 out of 179 countries
- The Economist EIU: Democracy Index 2011, ranked 111 out of 167 countries

== Technology ==
- World Intellectual Property Organization: Global Innovation Index 2026, ranked 59 out of 139 countries

== Tourism ==
- World Economic Forum's Travel and Tourism Competitiveness Report 2011, ranked 90 out of 139 countries.

== Transportation ==
- Motor vehicles per capita in 2007, ranked 93 out of 144 countries
