= List of rivers of Morocco =

This is a list of rivers in Morocco. This list is arranged north to south by drainage basin, with respective tributaries indented under each larger stream's name.

== Atlantic Ocean ==
- Loukkos River
- Sebou River (Guigou River)
  - Baht River
    - Oued Rkel
  - Ouegha River
  - Inaouen River
    - Lebne River
  - Fes River
- Bou Regreg
  - Grou River
    - Korifla River
- Oued Nefifikh
- Oued Mellah
- Oum Rbia River
  - Tessaoute River
    - Lakhdar River
  - El-Abid River
- Tensift River
  - Nfis River
  - Ourika River
- Oued Ksob
- Oued Tamri
- Sous River
- Massa River
- Noun River (Assaka River)
- Draa River
  - Dadès River
  - Ouarzazate River
  - Imini River

== Mediterranean Sea ==
- Laou River
- Rhîs River
- Nekor River
- Kert River
- Río de Oro
- Moulouya River
  - Za River
  - Msoun River
  - Melloulou River

== Sahara Desert ==
- Oued Guir
- Ziz River
  - Oued Rheris
    - Oued Todrha

== See also ==
- List of rivers in Western Sahara
