= Eyl (disambiguation) =

Eyl is a city in Somalia. Eyl or EYL may also refer to:

- English Young Liberals, the youth and student wing of the English Liberal Democrats
- Eureka Youth League, historical youth arm of the Communist Party of Australia
- Eureka Youth League, far-right organisation which emerged from the youth wing of the Australia First Party
- EYL, the IATA code for Yélimané Airport in Mali
- Eyl District, a district in the northeastern Nugal region of Somalia, of which the city, Eyl, is the capital
- Eyl River, a river in Somalia running through Eyl District
