= Isabel de Urquiola =

19th-century Spanish explorer

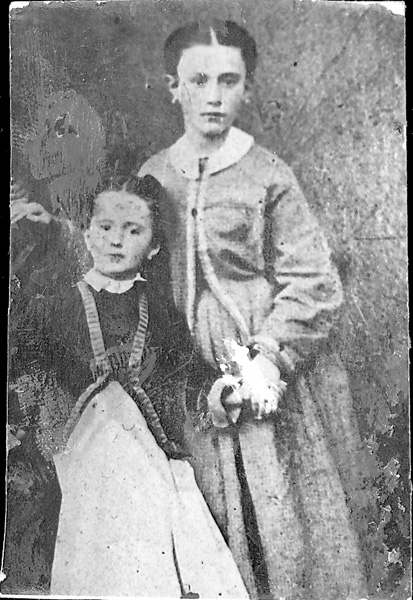
Isabel de Urquiola with her younger sister

Isabel Urquiola Estala (1854-1911) was a Spanish explorer who in 1874 accompanied her husband Manuel Iradier and her younger sister Manuela (or possibly Juliana) on an expedition to Africa. While Iradier travelled some 1,900 km from Corisco Bay up the Muni River, hoping to reach the Spanish colonies in the African interior, the two sisters remained on the island of Elobey Chico during his absence. Today Isabel Urquiola and her sister are remembered for the meticulous meteorological data they recorded while spending some eight months on the island. Isabel Urquiola never recovered from her experiences in Africa, having lost a child there and suffered from fever.

== Biography ==
Born in Vitoria-Gasteiz on 8 July 1854, Isabel Urquiola Estala was the daughter Domingo de Urquiola, a baker, and Sebastiana de Estala. She attended meetings of La Joven Exploradora, where she met Manuel Iradier who lectured on exotic countries. The two married in Vitoria on 16 November 1874. Inspired by Henry Morton Stanley, Iradier planned to undertake an exploratory expedition to Africa with his wife and her younger sister.

The three set out on their journey on 16 December 1874, taking a mail steamer to the Canary Islands. The following April, they continued on another steamer to the Gulf of Guinea, disembarking at Santa Isabel on the island of Fernando Poo on 16 May 1875. There they were received by the Spanish governor who tried unsuccessfully to dissuade them from continuing their journey to Elobey Chico on the grounds that the island lacked drinking water and was no longer under Spanish protection. Undeteered, they continued their journey, reaching the island two days later.

Shortly after their arrival on the little island, from June 1875 the two sisters undertook careful monitoring of the weather conditions up to eight times a day. Even during the lengthy absences of Iradier who was exploring the Muni River, they systematically recorded temperature, relative humidity and windspeed for a full seven months until December 1875. The detail of the records is exceptional for the period.

While on Elobey Chico, Isabel Urquiola became pregnant. On their return to Santa Isabel, their daughter, Isabel, was born in January 1876 but died of malaria on 28 November. Isabel Urquiola worked as a teacher in a school for girls in Santa Isabel but did not receive the salary she had been promised. Despite formal complaints, it was not adjusted and she and her sister returned to Spain in March 1877, followed shortly afterwards by her husband.

Isabel de Urquiola died in Madrid on 16 September 1911.
