= List of rivers in Western Sahara =

This is a list of rivers in Western Sahara, Morocco. This list is arranged north to south by drainage basin, with respective tributaries indented under each larger stream's name.

== Atlantic Ocean ==
- Saquia al Hamra
  - Oued el Khatt (Uad el Jat)
  - Oued Tigsert
  - Oued Lejcheibi
    - Oued Terguet
    - Oued Gaddar Talhu
    - Oued Dirt
- Oued Assaq (Uad Assag)
- Khatt Atui
