= List of countries by total renewable water resources =

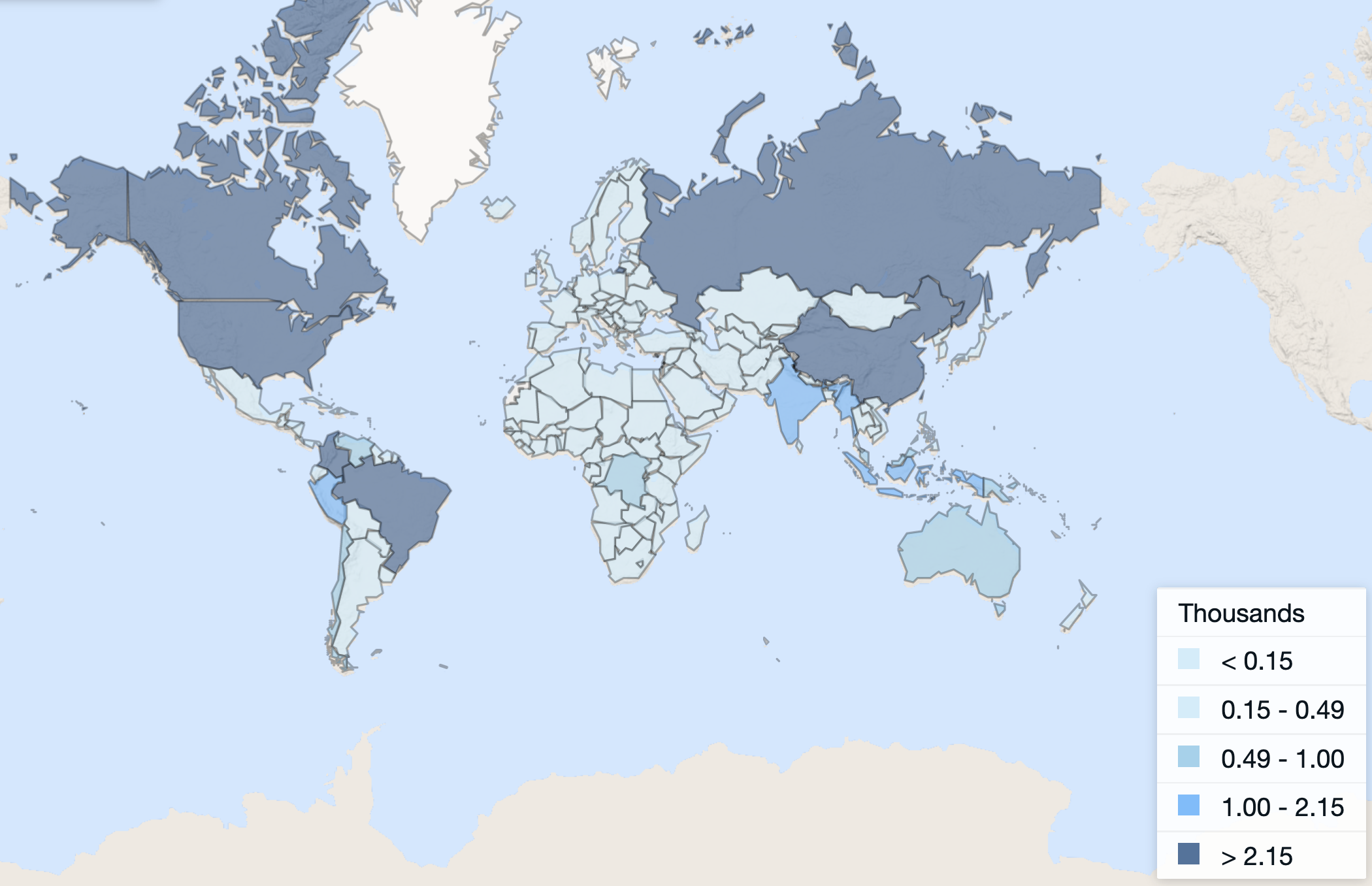
Global map of countries by total renewable internal freshwater resources (billion cubic meters) in 2020, according to World Bank

This is the list of countries by total renewable water resources for the year 2020, based on the latest data available in January 2024, by World Bank and Food and Agriculture Organization (AQUASTAT data). Fresh and unpolluted water accounts for 0.003% of total water available globally.

According to Food and Agriculture Organization, ″internal renewable water resources (IRWR) represents long-term average annual flow of rivers and recharge of aquifers generated from endogenous precipitation. External renewable water resources (ERWR) represents that part of the country's long-term average annual renewable water resources which are not generated in the country. It includes inflows from upstream countries (groundwater and surface water), and part of the water of border lakes and/or rivers. Total actual renewable water resources (TARWR) is the sum of internal renewable water resources and incoming flow originating outside the country. The computation of TARWR takes into account upstream abstraction and quantity of flows reserved to upstream and downstream countries through formal or informal agreements or treaties. It is a measure of the maximum theoretical amount of water actually available for the country.″

== Water resources ==
Out of all the water on Earth, saline water in oceans, seas and saline groundwater make up about 97% of it. Only 2.5–2.75% is fresh water, including 1.75–2% frozen in glaciers, ice and snow, 0.5–0.75% as fresh groundwater and soil moisture, and less than 0.01% of it as surface water in lakes, swamps and rivers. Freshwater lakes contain about 87% of this fresh surface water, including 29% in the African Great Lakes, 22% in Lake Baikal in Russia, 21% in the North American Great Lakes, and 14% in other lakes. Swamps have most of the balance with only a small amount in rivers, most notably the Amazon River. The atmosphere contains 0.04% water. In areas with no fresh water on the ground surface, fresh water derived from precipitation may, because of its lower density, overlie saline ground water in lenses or layers. Most of the world's fresh water is frozen in ice sheets. Many areas suffer from lack of distribution of fresh water, such as deserts.

== List of countries by total renewable water resources ==
The following table provides information on annual renewable water resources based on data published by World Bank and Food and Agriculture Organization. Total renewable water resources per capita are calculated using the World Bank's population estimates. Sorting is alphabetical by country code, according to ISO 3166-1 alpha-3.

Country/Territory/Region/Group	Internal renewable water resources (bln m^{3}/year)	External renewable water resources (bln m^{3}/year)	Total renewable water resources (bln m^{3}/year)	Total renewable water resources per capita (m^{3}/year/inhab)	Freshwater withdrawal as % of total renewable water resources (%)
(United Nations) WORLD					5.50%
Angola	148.00	0.40	148.40	4515.27	4.43%
Albania	26.90	3.30	30.20	10494.14	9.48%
Andorra	0.32		0.32	4084.64	4.06%
Afghanistan	0.15		0.15	15.17	16.00%
Argentina	292.00	584.24	876.24	19387.65	6.44%
Armenia	6.86	0.91	7.77	2621.79	2.45%
Antigua and Barbuda	0.05		0.05	531.00	561.00%
Australia	492.00		492.00	19294.21	19.18%
Austria	55.00	22.70	77.70	8627.20	6.17%
Azerbaijan	8.12	26.56	34.67	3419.90	804.00%
Burundi	10.06	2.48	12.54	1054.26	823.00%
Belgium	12.00	6.30	18.30	1579.00	1.04%
Benin	10.30	16.09	26.39	2176.82	815.00%
Burkina Faso	12.50	1.00	13.50	645.83	581.00%
Bangladesh	105.00	1122.03	1227.03	7450.58	627.00%
Bulgaria	21.00	0.30	21.30	3065.43	3.03%
Bahrain		0.11	0.12	68.17	3.00%
Bahamas	0.70		0.70	1780.07	1.72%
Bosnia and Herzegovina	35.50	2.00	37.50	11430.07	10.70%
Belarus	34.00	23.90	57.90	6127.42	3.63%
Belize	15.26	6.47	21.73	54659.13	38.64%
Bolivia	303.50	270.50	574.00	49173.22	25.43%
Brazil	5661.00	2986.00	8647.00	40680.39	26.55%
Barbados	0.08		0.08	278.38	285.00%
Brunei	8.50		8.50	19429.50	19.24%
Bhutan	78.00		78.00	101087.60	100.97%
Botswana	2.40	9.84	12.24	5204.91	943.00%
Central African Republic	141.00		141.00	29193.95	26.39%
Canada	2850.00	10.15	2860.15	73469.05	74.99%
Switzerland	40.40	13.10	53.50	6181.67	4.68%
Chile	885.00	38.06	923.06	48286.79	45.85%
China	2812.90	27.32	2840.22	1930.43	1.99%
Ivory Coast	76.84	7.30	84.14	3189.75	2.87%
Cameroon	273.00	355.50	476.10	28476.64	10.31%
DR Congo	900.00	383.00	1283.00	14325.37	9.69%
Congo	222.00	610.00	832.00	150776.89	38.93%
Colombia	2145.00	215.00	2360.00	46381.01	42.12%
Comoros	1.20		1.20	1379.94	1.49%
Cape Verde	0.30	52.00	52.30	76890.15	515.00%
Costa Rica	113.00		113.00	22182.45	22.06%
Cuba	38.12		38.12	3365.52	3.37%
Cyprus	0.78		0.78	646.04	630.00%
Czech Republic	13.15		13.15	1227.94	1.23%
Germany	107.00	47.00	154.00	1838.06	1.29%
Djibouti	0.30		0.30	303.64	275.00%
Dominica	0.20		0.20	2778.32	2.78%
Denmark	6.00		6.00	1035.88	1.03%
Dominican Republic	23.50		23.50	2166.32	2.14%
Algeria	11.25	0.42	11.67	266.06	259.00%
Ecuador	442.40		442.40	25075.02	25.15%
Egypt	1.00	56.50	57.50	561.88	9.00%
Eritrea	2.80	4.51	7.32	2062.64	787.00%
Spain	111.20	0.30	111.50	2384.78	2.35%
Estonia	12.71	0.10	12.81	9653.72	9.56%
Ethiopia	122.00		122.00	1061.21	1.04%
Finland	107.00	3.00	110.00	19853.02	19.35%
Fiji	28.55		28.55	31848.02	31.02%
France	200.00	11.00	211.00	3232.55	2.96%
Gabon	164.00	2.00	166.00	74582.14	71.54%
United Kingdom	145.00	2.00	147.00	2165.39	2.16%
Georgia	58.13	5.20	63.33	15875.49	15.62%
Ghana	30.30	25.90	56.20	1808.65	942.00%
Guinea	226.00		226.00	17208.83	17.12%
Gambia	3.00	5.00	8.00	3310.34	1.17%
Guinea-Bissau	16.00	15.40	31.40	15955.28	7.94%
Equatorial Guinea	26.00		26.00	18531.92	16.29%
Greece	58.00	10.40	68.40	6562.38	5.42%
Grenada	0.20		0.20	1777.41	1.62%
Guatemala	109.20	18.71	127.91	7139.60	6.48%
Guyana	241.00	30.00	271.00	344541.75	302.31%
Honduras	90.66	1.50	92.16	9305.16	8.96%
Croatia	37.70	67.80	105.50	25698.69	9.31%
Haiti	13.01	1.01	14.02	1229.73	1.15%
Hungary	6.00	98.00	104.00	10765.65	615.00%
Indonesia	2018.70		2018.70	7380.35	7.43%
India	1446.00	464.90	1910.90	1384.71	1.04%
Ireland	49.00	3.00	52.00	10531.04	9.83%
Iran	128.50	8.54	137.04	1631.63	1.47%
Iraq	35.20	54.66	89.86	2234.07	827.00%
Iceland	170.00		170.00	498178.72	463.89%
Israel	0.75	1.03	1.78	205.65	81.00%
Italy	182.50	8.80	191.30	3163.98	3.07%
Jamaica	10.82		10.82	3654.98	3.84%
Jordan	0.68	0.26	0.94	91.83	62.00%
Japan	430.00		430.00	3399.84	3.41%
Kazakhstan	64.35	44.06	108.41	5773.64	3.43%
Kenya	20.70	10.00	30.70	570.94	398.00%
Kyrgyzstan	48.93	−25.31	23.62	3620.06	7.44%
Cambodia	120.60		0.30	539.58	7.36%
Saint Kitts and Nevis	0.02		0.02	451.14	504.00%
South Korea	64.85	4.85	69.70	1359.49	1.25%
Kuwait		0.02	0.02	4.68	0.00%
Laos	190.40	143.10	333.50	45838.40	26.01%
Lebanon	4.80	−0.30	4.50	659.74	848.00%
Liberia	200.00	32.00	232.00	45870.82	39.31%
Libya	0.70		0.70	101.87	105.00%
Saint Lucia	0.30		0.30	1633.75	1.67%
Sri Lanka	52.80		52.80	2465.76	2.41%
Lesotho	5.23	−2.21	3.02	1410.67	2.32%
Lithuania	15.46	9.04	24.50	8999.78	5.53%
Luxembourg	1.00	2.50	3.50	5591.25	1.59%
Latvia	16.94	18.00	34.94	18524.04	8.91%
Morocco	29.00		29.00	785.68	790.00%
Moldova	1.62	10.65	12.27	3041.67	615.00%
Madagascar	337.00		337.00	12170.01	11.94%
Maldives	0.03		0.03	55.50	58.00%
Mexico	409.00	52.89	461.89	3582.39	3.25%
North Macedonia	5.40	1.00	6.40	3071.94	2.61%
Mali	60.00	60.00	120.00	5925.68	2.83%
Malta	0.05		0.05	114.37	98.00%
Myanmar	1002.80	165.00	1167.80	21463.05	18.77%
Mongolia	34.80		34.80	10615.29	10.56%
Mozambique	100.30	116.80	217.10	6945.99	3.22%
Mauritania	0.40	11.00	11.40	2451.79	89.00%
Mauritius	2.75		2.75	2163.13	2.17%
Malawi	16.14	1.14	17.28	903.30	833.00%
Malaysia	580.00		580.00	17920.04	17.47%
Namibia	6.16	33.75	39.91	15707.00	2.48%
Niger	3.50	30.55	34.05	1406.64	144.00%
Nigeria	221.00	65.20	286.20	1388.38	1.06%
Nicaragua	156.21	8.31	164.52	24834.88	23.12%
Netherlands	11.00	80.00	91.00	5310.81	631.00%
Norway	382.00	11.00	393.00	72492.63	71.01%
Nepal	198.20	12.00	210.20	7214.24	6.75%
Nauru	0.01		0.01	923.87	812.00%
New Zealand	327.00		327.00	67810.91	64.24%
Oman	1.40		1.40	274.15	308.00%
Pakistan	55.00	191.80	246.80	1117.29	242.00%
Panama	136.60	2.70	139.30	32285.40	31.81%
Peru	1641.00	238.80	1879.80	57012.26	49.27%
Philippines	479.00		479.00	4371.19	4.27%
Papua New Guinea	801.00		801.00	89526.98	82.16%
Poland	53.60	6.90	60.50	1598.56	1.41%
Puerto Rico	7.10		7.10	2481.78	2.16%
North Korea	67.00	10.15	77.15	2992.77	2.59%
Portugal	38.00	39.40	77.40	7590.68	3.69%
Paraguay	117.00	270.77	387.77	54366.34	17.68%
Palestine	0.81	0.03	0.84	164.07	169.00%
Qatar	0.06		0.06	20.13	20.00%
Romania	42.38	169.63	212.01	11020.55	2.20%
Russia	4312.00	213.44	4525.44	31010.12	29.93%
Rwanda	9.50	3.80	13.30	1026.85	723.00%
Saudi Arabia	2.40		2.40	68.94	67.00%
Sudan	4.00	33.80	37.80	862.04	90.00%
Senegal	25.80	13.17	38.97	2327.41	1.57%
Singapore	0.60		0.60	102.56	106.00%
Solomon Islands	44.70		44.70	65076.49	64.67%
Sierra Leone	160.00		160.00	20057.71	19.43%
El Salvador	15.63	10.64	26.27	4050.13	2.48%
Somalia	6.00	8.70	14.70	924.92	363.00%
Serbia	8.41	153.79	162.20	18563.94	1.22%
South Sudan	26.00	23.50	49.50	4422.12	2.45%
São Tomé and Príncipe	2.18		2.18	9947.12	9.97%
Suriname	99.00		99.00	168759.97	163.08%
Slovakia	12.60	37.50	50.10	9176.43	2.31%
Slovenia	18.67	13.20	31.87	15329.94	8.88%
Sweden	171.00	3.00	174.00	17228.98	16.52%
Eswatini	2.64	1.87	4.51	3887.38	2.24%
Syria	7.13	9.67	16.80	960.08	343.00%
Chad	15.00	30.70	45.70	2782.20	901.00%
Togo	11.50	3.20	14.70	1775.64	1.36%
Thailand	224.51	214.10	438.61	6283.81	3.14%
Tajikistan	63.46	−41.55	21.91	2297.21	6.65%
Turkmenistan	227.00	−15.40	211.60	2508.92	225.00%
Timor-Leste	8.21		8.21	6230.82	6.32%
Trinidad and Tobago	3.84		3.84	2743.86	2.53%
Tunisia	4.20	0.42	4.62	390.49	345.00%
Turkey	1.41	23.36	24.77	4106.15	2.72%
Tanzania	84.00	12.27	96.27	1611.64	1.36%
Uganda	39.00	21.10	60.10	1313.92	878.00%
Ukraine	55.10	120.18	175.28	4007.89	1.25%
Uruguay	92.20	80.00	172.20	49572.07	26.89%
United Arab Emirates	0.15		0.15	1678.21	1.21%
United States	2818.00	251.00	3069.00	9271.83	8.50%
Uzbekistan	16.34	32.53	48.87	1460.15	477.00%
Saint Vincent and the Grenadines	0.10		0.10	901.39	956.00%
Venezuela	805.00	520.00	1325.00	46595.96	28.26%
Vietnam	359.42	524.70	884.12	9082.94	3.72%
Vanuatu	10.00		10.00	32557.91	32.08%
Zimbabwe	2.10		2.10	70.41	65.00%
Zambia	44.80	6.55	51.35	865.81	762.00%
South Africa	80.20	24.60	104.80	5700.62	4.24%
Yemen	12.26	7.74	20.00	1345.63	782.00%
Caribbean small states					49.91%
Pacific island small states					43.02%
Least developed countries: UN classification					4.27%
Low & middle income (WB)					4.82%
Low-income (WB)					3.48%
Middle-income (WB)					4.97%
Lower middle income (WB)					2.36%
Upper middle income (WB)					7.92%
High-income (WB)					8.64%
European Union					3.04%
OECD (Organisation for Economic Cooperation and Development)					9.32%

== See also ==
- List of countries by freshwater withdrawal
- List of rivers by discharge
- List of largest unfragmented rivers
