= Oued Rkel =

Coordinates: 33.8272°N 5.9289°W

Oued Rkel or Oued El Kell is a wadi located in Fès-Meknès, Morocco. It is a tributary of the Baht River.
