= Mven River =

River in Equatorial Guinea

The Mven is a river of southwestern mainland Equatorial Guinea. It forms part of the Muni Estuary along with the Mitong, Mandyani, Mitimele, Utamboni and Congue rivers.
