= Mitimele River =

River of mainland Equatorial Guinea

Coordinates: 1°07′00″N 9°49′59″E

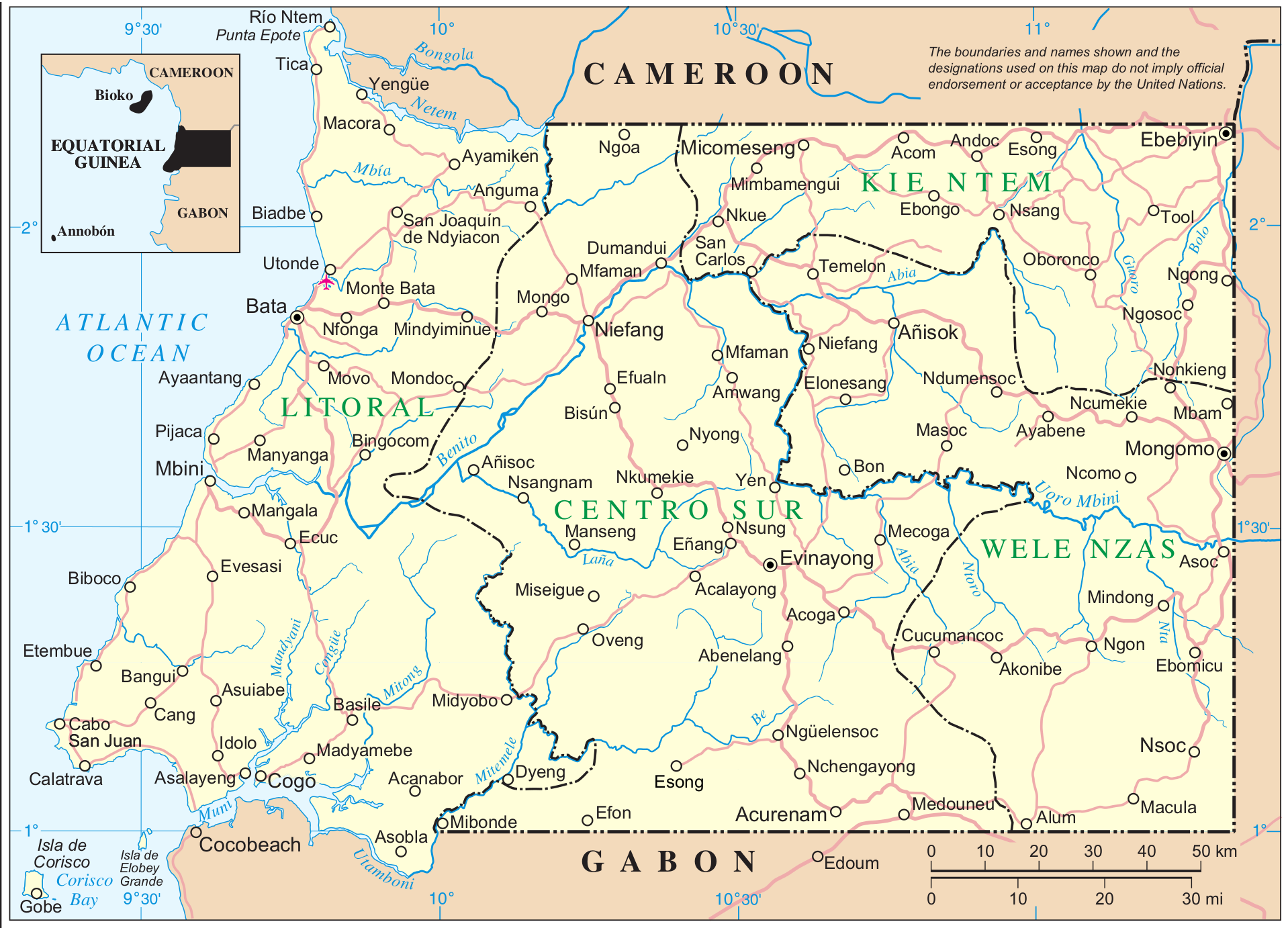
The river can be seen in the southwest, Click to view

The Mitimele is a river of southwestern mainland Equatorial Guinea. It forms part of the Muni Estuary along with the Mitong River, Mandyani River, Congue River, Utamboni River and Mven River. The river becomes the Utamboni River along the border with Gabon.
