= Oued el Khatt =

River in Western Sahara

The Oued el Khatt is an intermittent river and wadi which rises in central Western Sahara under Moroccan control, close to the border with Mauritania. The course of the wadi is initially southwesterly, turning north after its junction with the Oued Zbayra wadi close to the small settlement of Dhaym al-Khayl. From here, it runs north for some 200 kilometres before joining with the intermittent Saguia el-Hamra just south of Laayoune on the Atlantic coast.
