= List of rivers of Liechtenstein =

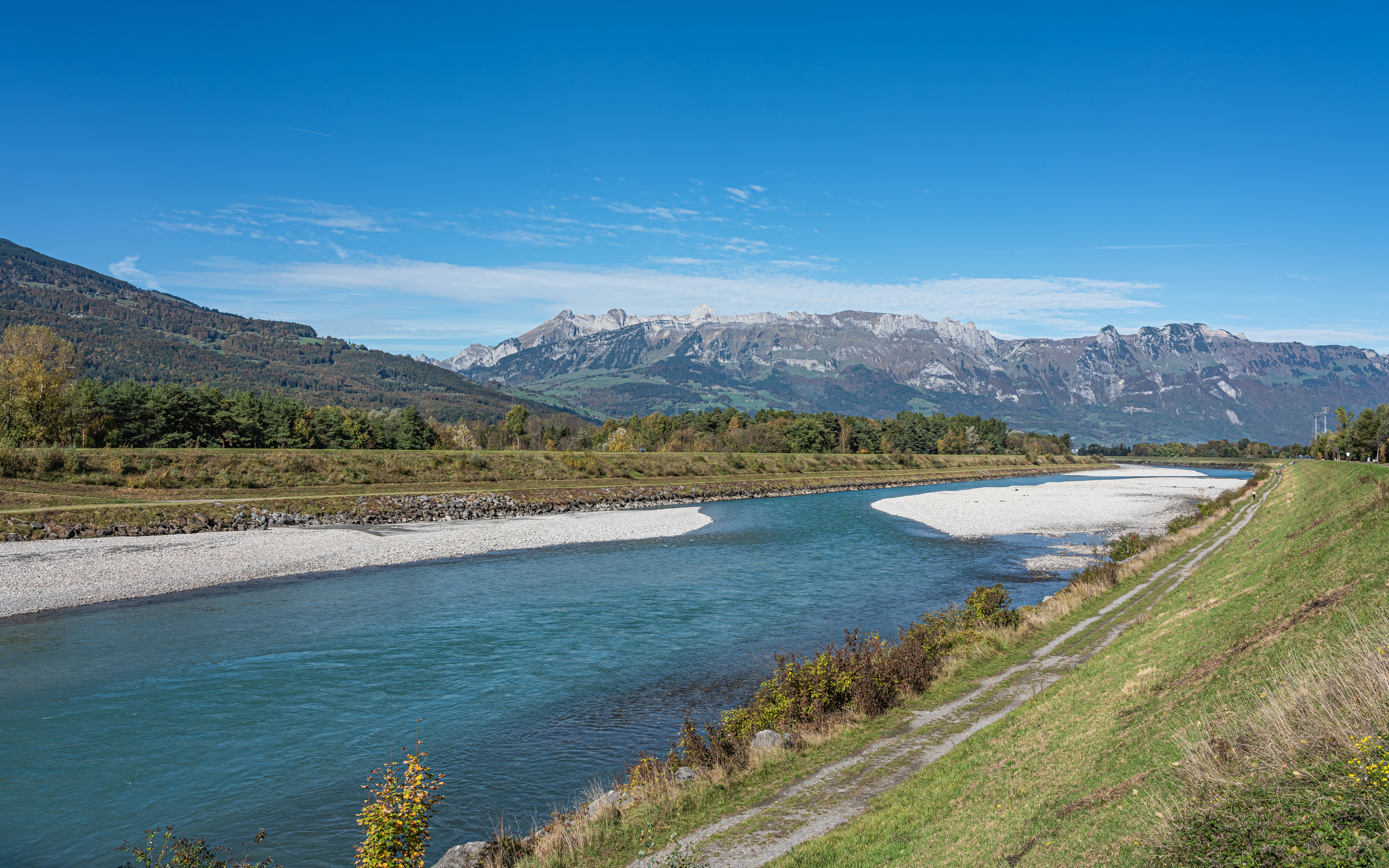
The Rhine at Vaduz

This is a list of rivers flowing through Liechtenstein.

- Rhine/Rhein, flows into the North Sea. It forms most of the country's border with Switzerland.
- Samina River/Saminabach, flows into the Ill. It originates in the Principality and continues into Austria.

Additionally, there are two more prominent rivulets and one natural lake.

- Liechtenstein inland canal (an artificial water stream completed in 1943; all former Rhine tributaries in the country, except the Ruggeller Mölibach, today flow into the canal)
- (Ruggeller) Mölibach (flows into the Spiersbach)
- Spiersbach (partly a border body of water between Liechtenstein and Austria), see also: Spiersbach Bridge
- Gampriner Seele (lake created by a Rhine flood in 1927)

Most ponds in the country are artificial, such as those in Hälos near Triesen (3.56 ha), in Schwabbrünnen-Äscher (0.4 ha), the Spoerry ponds, and the Steg reservoir (3.2 ha). The only non-artificial examples are a few small mountain ponds, and the aforementioned Gampriner Seele.
