= List of rivers of the Gambia =

This is a list of rivers in the Gambia. This list is arranged by drainage basin, with respective tributaries indented under each larger stream's name.

== Atlantic Ocean ==
- Massarinko Bolon
  - Niji Bolon
- Gambia River
  - Buniadu Bolon
  - Lamin Bolon
  - Mandina Bolon
  - Pirang Bolon
  - Bulok Bolon
  - Sami Bolon
  - Bintang Bolon
  - Jurunku Bolon
  - Koular Bolon (Mini Minium Bolon)
  - Boa Bolon
  - Sofaniama Bolon
  - Simbara Bolon
  - Nianija Bolon
  - Pallan Bolon
  - Pachar Bolon
  - Sandougou River
  - Punti Bolon
  - Mansala Bolon
  - Sankutu Bolon
  - Tuba Kuta Bolon
  - Prufu Bolon
    - Kumbija Bolon
  - Shima Simong Bolon
  - Sine Bolon
- Oyster Creek
- Cape Creek
- Kotu Stream
- River Tanji
- Tujering River
- River Benifet
- Allahein River
