= Mandyani River =

River of Equatorial Guinea

Coordinates: 1°10′N 9°45′E

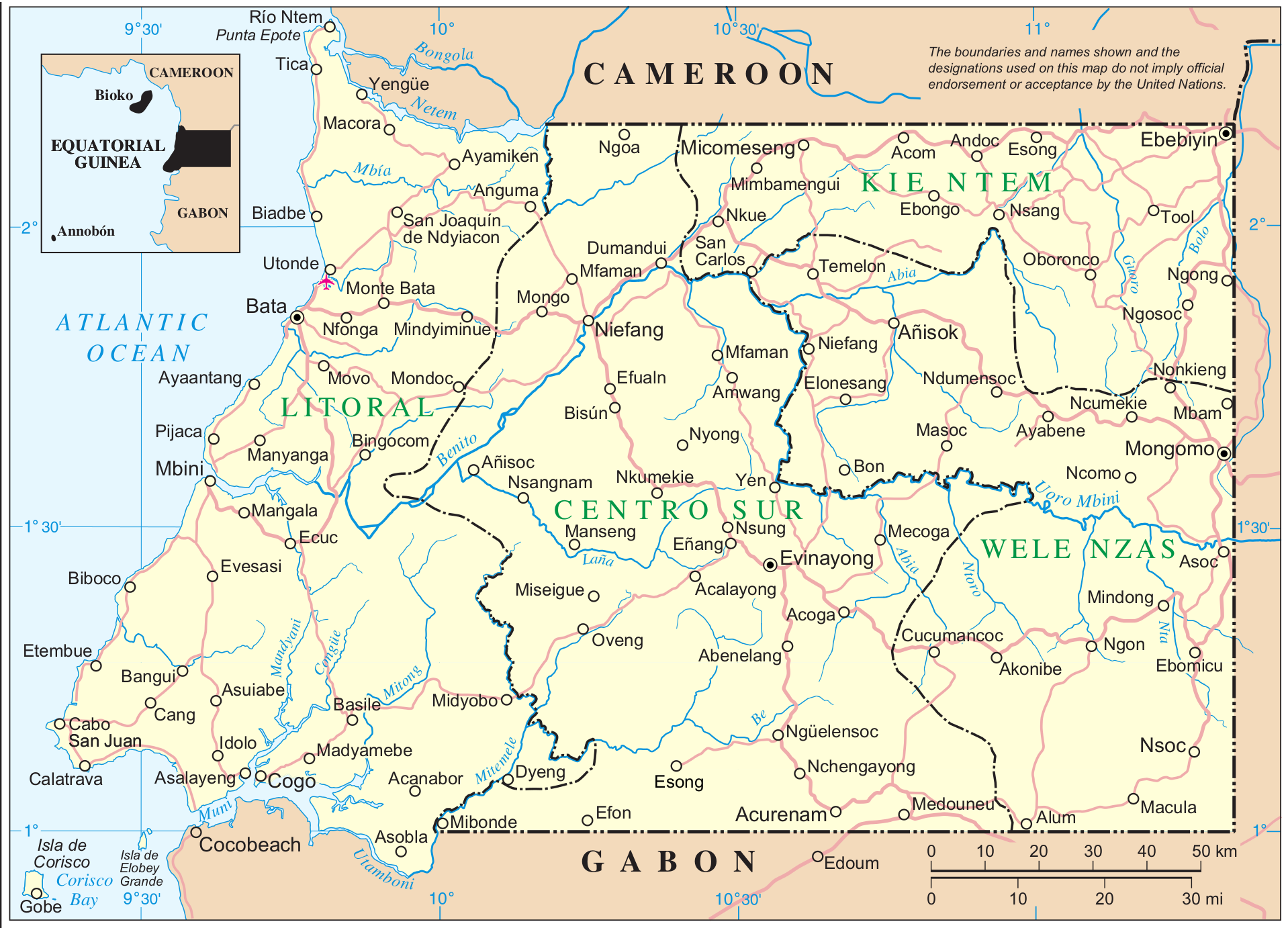
The river can be seen in the southwest, Click to view

The Mandyani is a river of southwestern mainland Equatorial Guinea. It forms part of the Muni Estuary along with the Mitong River, Congue River, Mitimele River, Utamboni River and Mven River.
