= List of rivers of Eswatini =

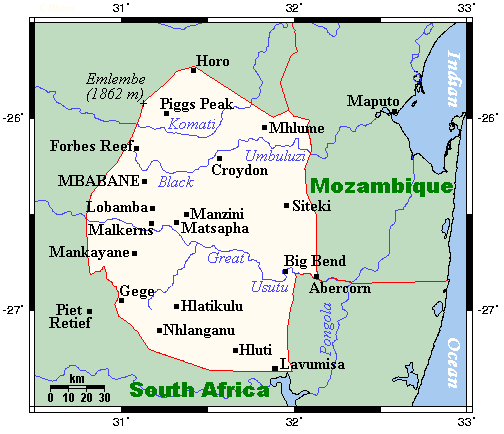
Map of Eswatini showing some of the main rivers.

This is a list of rivers in Eswatini. This list is arranged by drainage basin, with respective tributaries indented under each larger stream's name.

== Rivers ==
- Komati River (Nkomanzi River)
  - Mlumati River (Lomati River)
- Mbuluzi River (Imbuluzi River)
  - Black Mbuluzi River
  - White Mbuluzi River
- Tembe River
- Lusutfu River (Great Usutu River)
  - Pongola River (South Africa)
  - Lusushwana River (Little Usutu River)
    - Mzimene River
    - Mbabane River
- Ngwavuma River
  - Mozane River
  - Nyetane River
  - Mhlatuze River
  - Mtendekwa River
  - Mhlatuzane River
  - Mzimphofu River
  - Mkondvo River (Assegai River)
  - Ngwempisi River
  - Polonjane River
