= Saguia el-Hamra (river) =

River in Western Sahara

Coordinates: 27.2097°N 13.3753°W

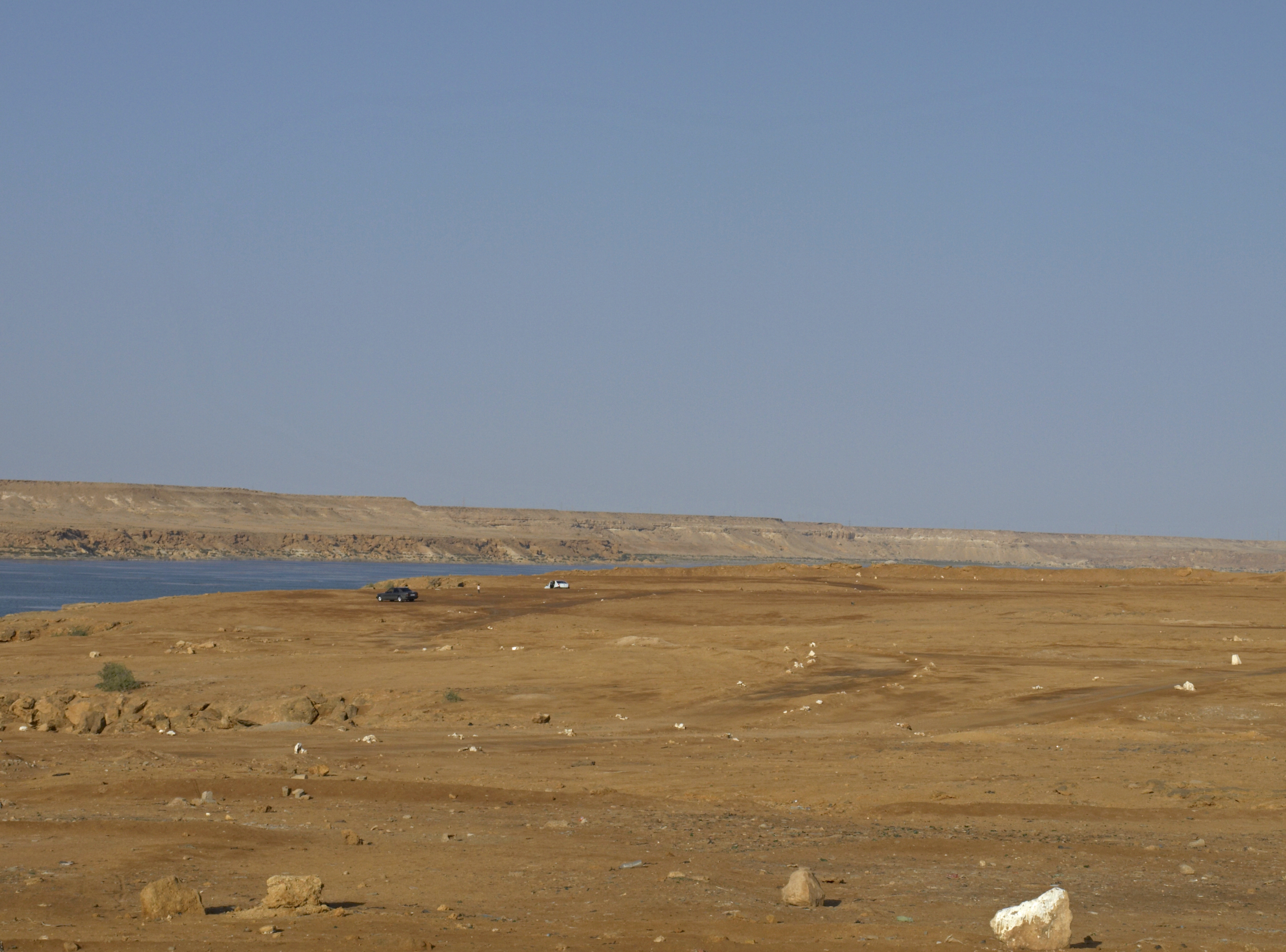
Water reservoir in Laayoune

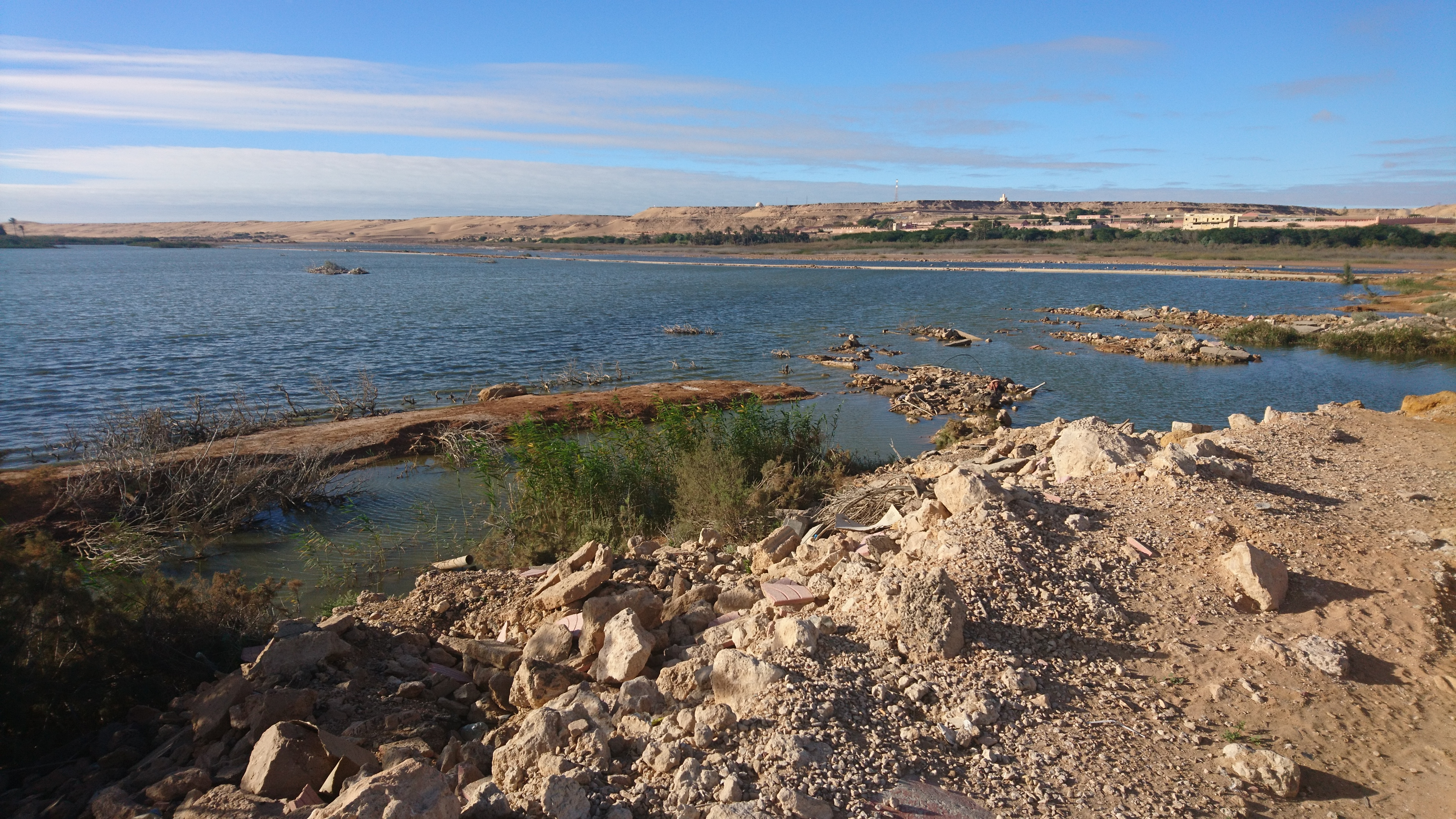

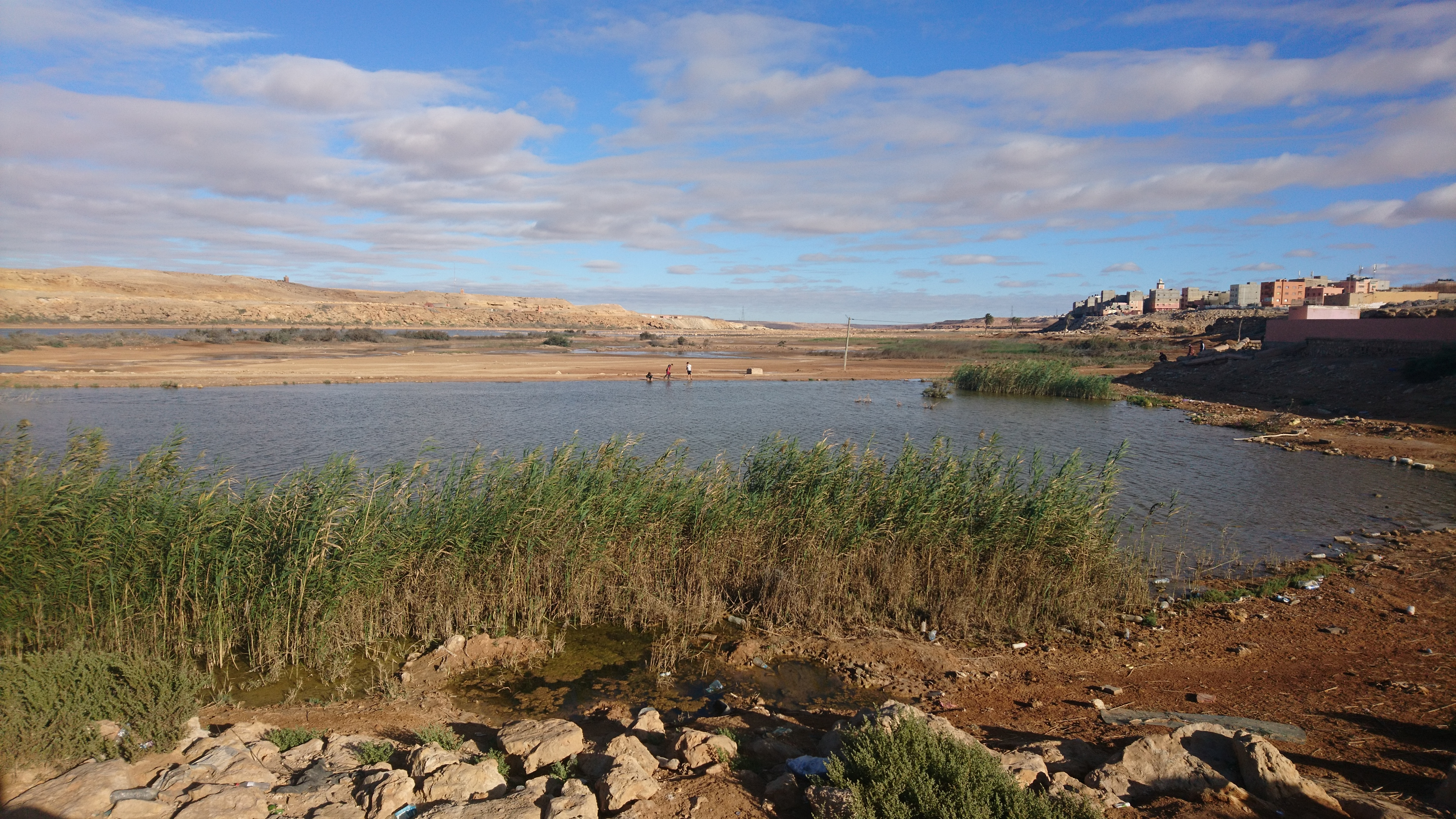

The Saquia el-Hamra (Arabic: الساقية الحمراء lit. The Red Saturater) is a wadi and intermittent river which rises in the northeast of Western Sahara, some 30 kilometres (19 mi) southeast of Farsia. The wadi continues west, passing close to Haouza and Smara before joining with the intermittent Oued el Khatt just south of Laayoune on the Atlantic coast. The wadi gives its name to the Saquia el-Hamra region.

In February 2016, astronauts aboard the International Space Station photographed the area around Laayoune, with Saquia el-Hamra river clearly visible.

In 2024, plans were published to build a viaduct over Saguia el-Hamra on a prospective high-speed road connecting Tiznit and Dakhla. With the length of 1,648 metres (5,407 ft), it is projected to be the longest bridge in Africa.
