= List of longest undammed rivers =

This is a list of the longest undammed rivers of the world, ordered by length.

Continent color key
Africa	Asia	Europe	North America	Oceania	South America

Length color key
Over 5,000 kilometres (3,100 mi)	3,000 to 5,000 kilometres (1,900 to 3,100 mi)	2,000 to 3,000 kilometres (1,200 to 1,900 mi)	1,000 to 2,000 kilometres (620 to 1,240 mi)	Less than 1,000 kilometres (620 mi)

River	Length	Drainage area	Average discharge (m³/s)	Mouth	Notes	Reference	Rank
Amazon River	6,937 km (4,310 mi); 6,992 km (4,345 mi)	7,050,000 km^{2} (2,720,000 mi^{2})	219,000 m^{3}/s (7,700,000 cu ft/s)	Atlantic Ocean	Largest and second-longest river in the world, undammed as well as unbridged, does not form a delta while joining the sea due to adequate thrust of river water to overcome the sea water wave and tidal thrusts.		1
Lena River	4,472 km (2,779 mi)	2,500,000 km^{2} (970,000 mi^{2})	17,000 m^{3}/s (600,000 cu ft/s)	Arctic Ocean	Longest undammed river in Asia.		2
Amur–Shilka–Onon	4,197 km (2,608 mi)	1,855,000 km^{2} (716,000 mi^{2})	11,700 m^{3}/s (410,000 cu ft/s)	Strait of Tartary			3
Mackenzie–Slave–Athabasca	3,403 km (2,115 mi)	1,805,200 km^{2} (697,000 mi^{2})	10,700 m^{3}/s (380,000 cu ft/s)	Arctic Ocean	The Peace–Finlay system would extend even longer from the head of the Slave but there are dams on the Peace.		4
Nizhnyaya Tunguska River	2,989 km (1,857 mi)	473,000 km^{2} (183,000 mi^{2})	3,680 m^{3}/s (130,000 cu ft/s)	Yenisei River	The Russian government is planning to build hydro dams on the river within the next few years.		5
Salween River	2,815 km (1,749 mi)	324,000 km^{2} (125,000 mi^{2})	6,700 m^{3}/s (240,000 cu ft/s)	Andaman Sea	Longest undammed Southeast Asian river. Burma is planning to build the Tasang Dam and several others.		6
Paraguay River	2,549 km (1,584 mi)	1,150,000 km^{2} (440,000 mi^{2})	4,550 m^{3}/s (161,000 cu ft/s)	Paraná River			7
Amu Darya–Panj	2,500 km (1,600 mi)	534,700 km^{2} (206,400 mi^{2})	1,330 m^{3}/s (47,000 cu ft/s)	Aral Sea (former)	Although undammed, heavy diversion through canals causes the river to frequently dry up without reaching its mouth. Tajikistan is planning to build a hydroelectric dam on the Panj River.		8
Aldan River	2,273 km (1,412 mi)	729,000 km^{2} (281,000 mi^{2})	5,060 m^{3}/s (179,000 cu ft/s)	Lena River			
Rio Negro	2,230 km (1,390 mi)	691,000 km^{2} (267,000 mi^{2})	29,300 m^{3}/s (1,030,000 cu ft/s)	Amazon River			
Vitim River	1,978 km (1,229 mi)			Lena River			
Indigirka River	1,726 km (1,072 mi)	360,400 km^{2} (139,200 mi^{2})	1,810 m^{3}/s (64,000 cu ft/s)	Arctic Ocean			
Fraser River	1,375 km (854 mi)	220,000 km^{2} (85,000 mi^{2})	3,475 m^{3}/s (122,700 cu ft/s)	Pacific Ocean			
Kuskokwim River	1,165 km (724 mi)	120,000 km^{2} (46,000 mi^{2})	1,900 m^{3}/s (67,000 cu ft/s)	Bering Sea			
Back River	1,150 km (710 mi)			Arctic Ocean			
Anadyr River	1,150 km (710 mi)	191,000 km^{2} (74,000 mi^{2})	2,020 m^{3}/s (71,000 cu ft/s)	Gulf of Anadyr			
Liard River	1,115 km (693 mi)	277,100 km^{2} (107,000 mi^{2})	2,434 m^{3}/s (86,000 cu ft/s)	Mackenzie River			
Yellowstone River	1,114 km (692 mi)	181,300 km^{2} (70,000 mi^{2})	380 m^{3}/s (13,000 cu ft/s)	Missouri River	Longest undammed river in the contiguous United States.		
Maya River	1,053 km (654 mi)	171,000 km^{2} (66,000 mi^{2})	1,180 m^{3}/s (42,000 cu ft/s)	Aldan River			
Fly River	1,050 km (650 mi)	76,000 km^{2} (29,000 mi^{2})	6,500 m^{3}/s (230,000 cu ft/s)	Gulf of Papua	Largest completely undammed river system in the world		
White River	934 km (580 mi)	26,000 km^{2} (10,000 mi^{2})	16 m^{3}/s (570 cu ft/s)	Missouri River			
Tanana River	916 km (569 mi)	113,960 km^{2} (44,000 mi^{2})	1,172 m^{3}/s (41,400 cu ft/s)	Yukon River			
Thelon River	900 km (560 mi)	142,400 km^{2} (55,000 mi^{2})		Hudson Bay			
Salmon River	684 km (425 mi)	36,000 km^{2} (14,000 mi^{2})	310 m^{3}/s (11,000 cu ft/s)	Snake River			
Stikine River	610 km (380 mi)	52,000 km^{2} (20,000 mi^{2})	1,580 m^{3}/s (56,000 cu ft/s)	Pacific Ocean			
Skeena River	570 km (350 mi)	54,400 km^{2} (21,000 mi^{2})	1,760 m^{3}/s (62,000 cu ft/s)	Pacific Ocean			
Susitna River	504 km (313 mi)	52,000 km^{2} (20,000 mi^{2})	1,400 m^{3}/s (49,000 cu ft/s)	Pacific Ocean	Alaska is planning to build a hydroelectric dam on the river at Devil's Canyon.		

== See also ==
- List of largest unfragmented rivers
