= Mitong River (Equatorial Guinea) =

Coordinates: 1°03′N 10°58′E

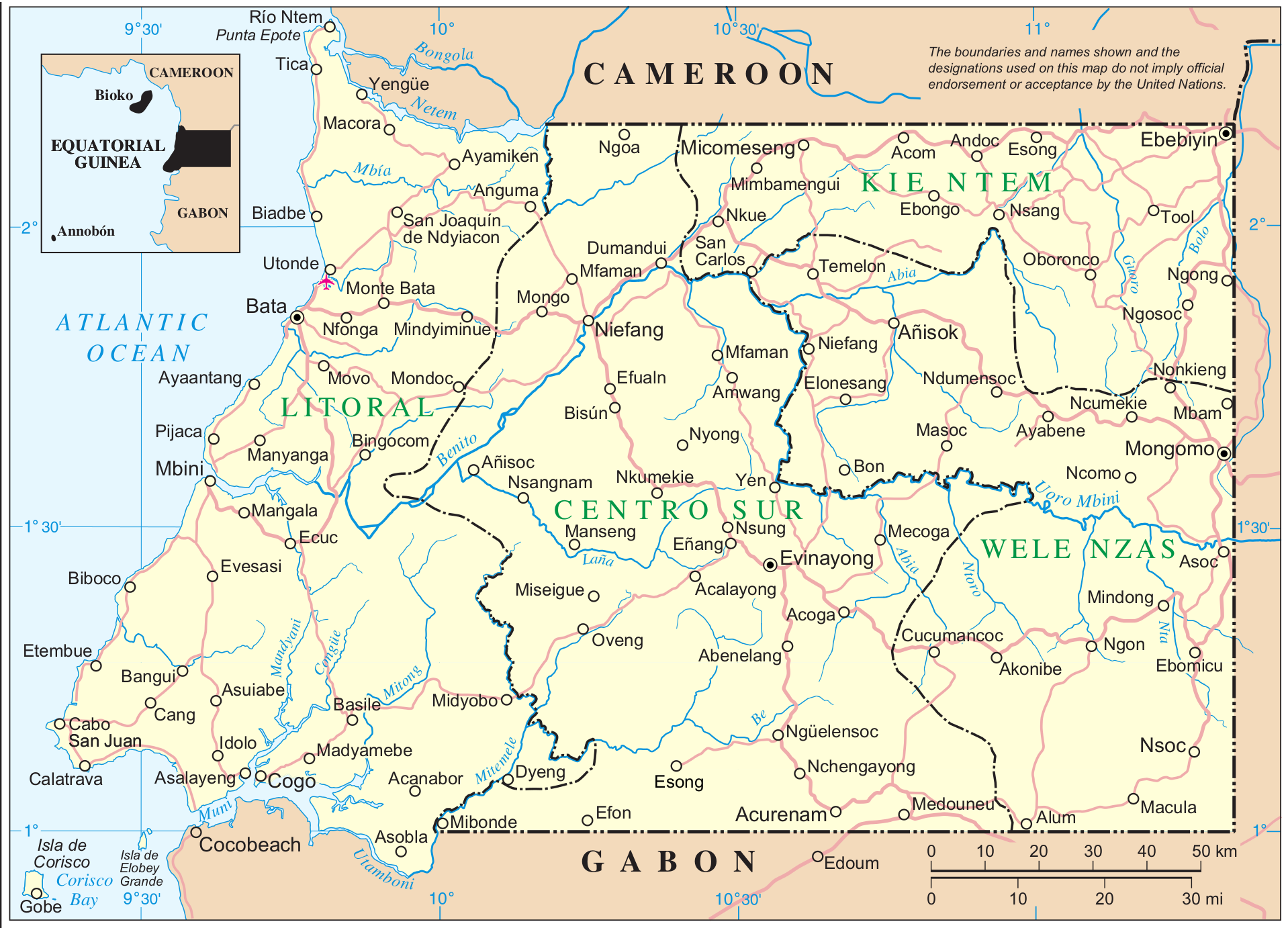
The river can be seen in the southwest, Click to view

The Mitong is a river of southwestern mainland Equatorial Guinea. It forms part of the Muni Estuary. In addition to the Mitong, the estuary is fed also by the Congue, Mandyani, Mitimele, Utamboni and Mven rivers.
