= Utamboni River =

River in Equatorial Guinea

Coordinates: 1°00′N 9°48′E

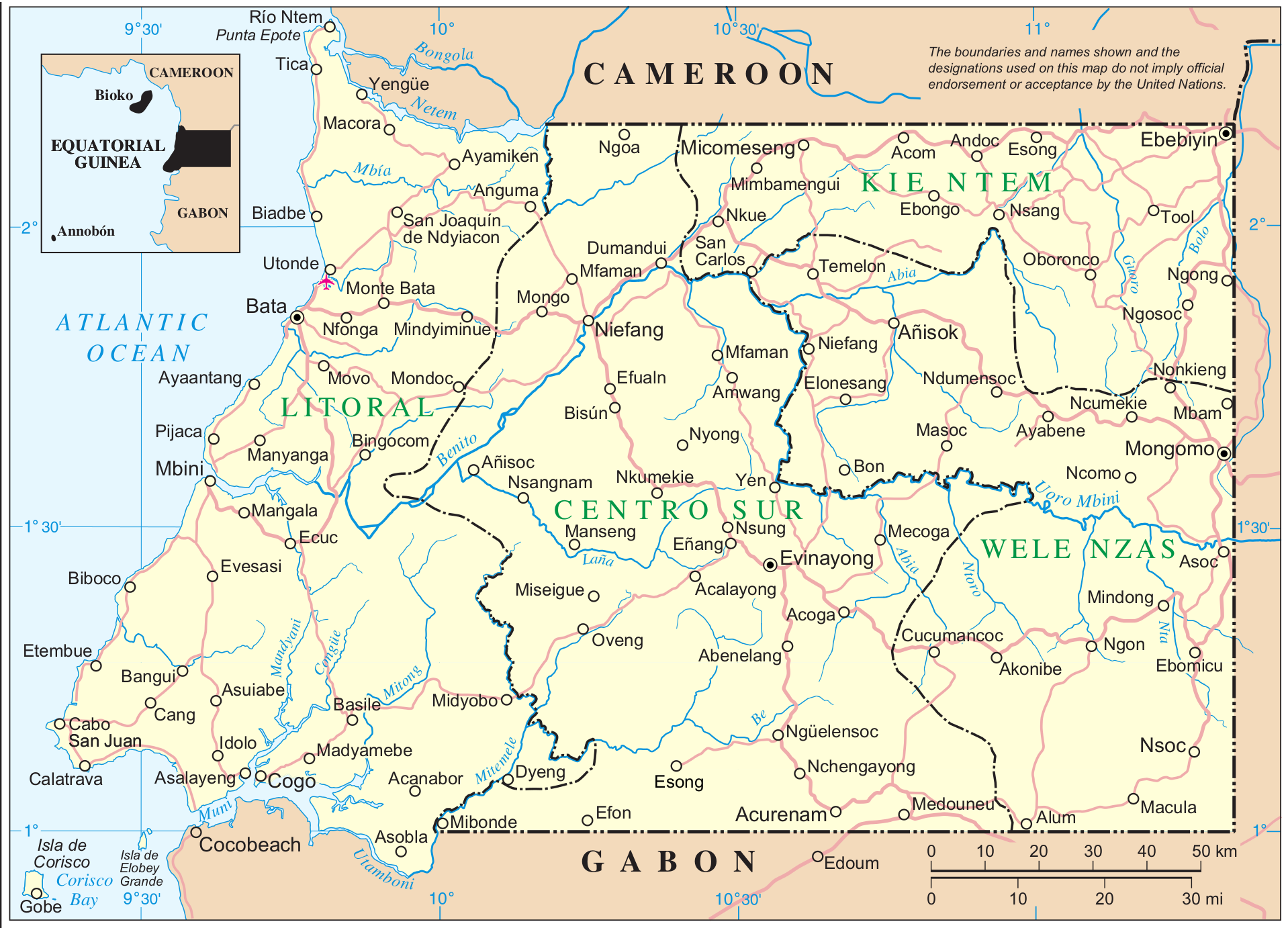
The river can be seen in the southwest, Click to view

The Utamboni is a river of southwestern mainland Equatorial Guinea. It flows along the border with Gabon and forms part of the Muni Estuary, feeding the estuary along with the Mitimele River (the upper part of the river), as well as the Mitong, Mandyani, Congue, and Mven rivers. The river becomes the Utamboni River along the border with Gabon.
