= List of valleys of Malta =

Malta does not have any permanent rivers, but does have numerous wadis (Wied in Maltese), which is an either permanently or intermittently dry riverbed. This is a list of wadis, and their accompanying valleys in Malta, arranged by locality. Wadis or valleys that cross more than one locality are listed in all that they cross.

== Attard ==
- Wied Inċita (Inċita Valley)
- Wied is-Sewda (Black Valley)
- Wied San Martin (St. Martin's Valley)
- Wied ta' Ċampra (Ċampra Valley)
- Wied ta' Ħemsija (Ħemsija Valley)
- Wied ta' Rmiedi (Rmiedi Valley)

== Balzan ==
- Wied Ħal-Balzan (Balzan Valley)

== Bidnija ==
- Wied Qannotta (Qannotta Valley)
- Wied l-Arkata (Arch Valley)
- Wied tal-Ħżejjen (Badest Valley)
- Wied tal-Pwales (Pwales Valley)
- Ras il-Wied (The Valley's Point)
- Wied tal-Imsellit (Msellit Valley)
- Wied Għajn Mula (Mula Spring Valley)
- Wied Għajn Riħana (Riħana Spring Valley)
- Wied Ċelestina (Celest Valley)

== Birkirkara ==
- Wied is-Sewda (Sewda Valley)
- Wied ta' Birkirkara (Birkirkara Valley) or Tal-Wejter Valley
- Wied ta' l-Imsida (Msida Valley)

== Birżebbuġa ==
- Wied Dalam (Dalam Valley) - Għar Dalam
- Wied Ħas-Saptan (Saptan Valley)
- Wied il-Buni (Buni Valley)
- Wied il-Qoton (Coton Valley)
- Wied ix-Xoqqa (Linen Valley)
- Wied tal-Klima (Climate Valley)
- Wied Żembaq (Żembaq Valley)
- Wied Żnuber (Fir Valley)

== Dingli ==
- Wied Ħażrun (Hazrun Valley)
- Wied il-Bużbież (Fennel Valley)
- Wied Liemu (Liemu Valley)

== Comino ==
- Wied l-Aħmar (The Red Valley)
- Wied Ta' Bieqa (Ta' Bieqa Valley)

== Fgura ==
- Wied Blandun (Blandun Valley)

== Fontana ==
- Wied Siekel (Siekel Valley)
- Wied tal-Lunzjata (Lunzjata Valley)

== Għajnsielem ==
- Wied ir-Rajjes (Rajjes Valley)
- Wied Martin (Martin Valley)
- Wied tal-Imġarr (Mġarr Valley)

== Għargħur ==
- Wied Anġlu (Angel Valley)
- Wied Santa Marija taż-Żellieqa (St. Mary of Zellieqa Valley)
- Wied id-Dis (Madliena Valley / Gharghur Valley)
- Wied id-Dib (Wolf's Valley)
- Wied Faħam (Coal Valley)
- Wied ta' Piswella (Piswella Valley)
- Wied ta' Santa Katerina (St. Catherine's Valley)

== Għasri ==
- Wied is-Seqer (Seqer Valley)
- Wied l-Għasri (Għasri Valley)
- Wied Sara (Sara Valley)
- Wied tal-Ort (Garden Valley)
- Wied tal-Qattus (Cat Valley)

== Għaxaq ==
- Wied Dalam (Dalam Valley)
- Wied Ħas-Saptan (Saptan Valley)

== Gudja ==
- Wied Betti

== Gżira ==
- Wied il-Kappara (Kappara Valley)

== Iklin ==
- Wied tal-Iklin (Iklin Valley)

== Kalkara ==
- Wied Għammieq (Għammieq Valley)
- Wied ta' Rnella (Rinella Valley)

== Kerċem ==
- Wied il-Ġifna (Ġifna Valley)
- Wied il-Ħmar (Donkey Valley)
- Wied Mans (Mans Valley)
- Wied tal-Grixti (Grixti Valley)
- Wied tal-Lunzjata (Lunzjata Valley)

== Lija ==
- Wied Ħal-Lija (Lija Valley)

== Luqa ==
- Wied Betti (Betti Valley)
- Wied il-Kbir (Grand Valley)
- Wied il-Knejjes (Churches Valley)
- Wied in-Noqor (Noqor Valley)

== Marsa ==
- Wied il-Ġonna (Gardens Valley)

== Marsaskala ==
- Wied il-Għajn (Spring's Valley)
- Wied iz-Ziju (Uncle's Valley)

== Marsaxlokk ==
- Wied ta' Marsaxlokk

== Mdina ==
- Wied il-Ħemsija (Hemsija Valley)
- Wied ta' Ġnien Ħira (Ħira Garden Valley)

== Mellieħa ==
- Wied Għarbiel (Net Valley)
- Wied l-Abjad (White Valley)
- Wied Musa (Musa Valley)
- Wied ta' Għajn Żejtuna (Olive Spring Valley)
- Wied ta' Rdum (Cliffs Valley)
- Wied ta' Ruman (Roman Valley)
- Wied tal-Ħanżira (Pig Valley)
- Wied tal-Kalkara (Kalkara Valley)
- Wied tal-Mellieħa (Mellieħa Valley)

== Mġarr ==
- Ras il-Wied
- Wied Ħalqun
- Wied il-Ħmir (Donkeys' Valley)
- Wied ta' Binġemma (Binġemma Valley)
- Wied tal-Imsellit (Msellit Valley)
- Wied tal-Ġnejna (Ġnejna Valley)
- Wied tas-Santi (Santi Valley)
- Wied taż-Żebbiegħ (Żebbiegħ Valley)

== Mosta ==
- Wied il-Qliegħa (Qlejja Valley)
- Wied il-Ħanżira (Pig Valley)
- Wied tal-Isperanza (Speranza Valley)
- Wied is-Sir (Sir Valley)
- Wied il-Għasel (Honey Valley)
- Wied Filep (Filpe Valley) - Demolished to make space for a stone quarry
- Wied Gananu (Gananu Valley)

All of the above form the Mosta Valley.

== Msida ==
- Wied Għollieqa (Għollieqa Valley)
- Wied tal-Imsida (Msida Valley)

== Munxar ==
- Wied is-Saqwi (Saqwi Valley)
- Wied ix-Xlendi (Xlendi Valley)
- Wied l-Għawdxija (Gozotin Woman's Valley)
- Wied tal-Kantra (Kantra Valley)

== Nadur ==
- Wied Binġemma (Binġemma Valley)
- Wied ir-Riħan (Riħan Valley)
- Wied San Blas (San Blas Valley)
- Wied ta' Kusbejja (Kusbejja Valley)

== Naxxar ==
- Wied Anġlu (Angel Valley)
- Wied Bordi (Bordi Valley)
- Wied Filep (Philep Valley)
- Wied il-Faħam (Coals Valley)
- Wied il-Għasel (Honey Valley)
- Wied Ta' Kieli (Kieli's Valley)

== Qala ==
- Wied Biljun (Bilion Valley)
- Wied Simar (Simar Valley)
- Wied tal-Blata (Rock's Valley)

== Qormi ==
- Wied iċ-Ċawsli (Mulberry Valley)
- Wied il-Kbir (Grand Valley)
- Wied is-Sewda (Black Valley)

== Qrendi ==
- Wied Ħoxt (Ħoxt Valley)
- Wied iż-Żurrieq (Żurrieq Valley)

== Rabat, Gozo ==
- Wied Beżżum Baw (Bezzum Baw Valley)
- Wied is-Seqer (Seqer Valley)
- Wied Karawendi (Karawendi Valley)
- Wied Sara (Sara Valley)
- Wied ta' Żieta (Ta' Żieta Valley)
- Wied taċ-Ċjanti (Ċjanti Valley)
- Wied tal-Belliegħa (Belliegħa Valley)
- Wied tal-Grazzja (Grazzia Valley)
- Wied tal-Kapuċċini (Capuchins Valley)
- Wied tal-Lunzjata (Lunzjata Valley)

== Rabat, Malta ==
- Wied il-Gerżuma (Gerzuma Valley)
- Wied Ħażrun (Hazrun Valley)
- Wied il-Baħrija (Baħrija Valley)
- Wied il-Bużbież (Fennel Valley)
- Wied il-Fiddien (Fiddien Valley)
- Wied il-Qliegħa (Chadwick Lakes)
- Wied iż-Żebbuġ (Olives Valley)
- Wied tal-Armla (Widow's Valley)
- Wied tal-Isqof (Bishop Valley)
- Wied Liemu (Liemu Valley)
- Wied Rini (Rini Valley)
- Wied Sant' Antnin (St. Anthony Valley)
- Wied Santi (Santi Valley)
- Wied Tal-Marġa (Marga Valley)

== San Ġiljan ==
- Wied Għomor (Għomor Valley)
- Wied Ħarq Ħamiem (Harq Hamiem Valley)
- Wied ta' Kalċi (Kalċi Valley)
- Wied tal-Balluta (Balluta Valley)

== San Ġwann ==
- Wied Għollieqa (Għollieqa Valley)
- Wied Għomor (Għomor Valley)

== San Pawl il-Baħar ==
- Wied Bufula (Warbler Valley)
- Wied Qannotta (Qannotta Valley)
- Wied Sardin (Sardine Valley)
- Wied ta' Għajn Riħana (Għajn Riħana Valley)
- Wied ta' Sejkla (Sejkla Valley)
- Wied tal-Ħżejjen (Baddest Valley)
- Wied tal-Mistra (Mistra Valley)
- Wied tal-Pwales (Pwales Valley)

== San Lawrenz ==
- Wied Ġuno (Juno Valley)
- Wied il-Kbir (Main Valley)
- Wied Merill (Merill Valley)
- Wied tal-Knisja (Church Valley)

== Santa Luċija ==
- Wied Ta' Garnaw (Ta' Garnaw Valley)

== Siġġiewi ==
- Wied Costa (Costa Valley)
- Wied il-Girgenti (Girgenti Valley)
- Wied Ħesri (Hesri Valley)
- Wied il-Luq (Luq Valley)
- Wied ix-Xagħri
- Wied Musa
- Wied ta' Manduca (Manduca Valley)
- Wied ta' San Antnin (St. Anthony's Valley)
- Wied Xkora (Sack Valley)

== Swieqi ==
- Wied Għomor (Għomor Valley)
- Wied id-Dis (Dis Valley)
- Wied il-Kbir tas-Swieqi (Swieqi Grand Valley)
- Wied Mejxu (Mejxu Valley)

== Xagħra ==
- Wied Bażżum Baw (Bazzum Baw Valley)
- Wied tal-Egħżien (Egħżien Valley)
- Wied tal-Għejun (Springs Valley)

== Xewkija ==
- Wied Imġarr ix-Xini (Mġarr ix-Xini Valley)

== Xgħajra ==
- Wied Glavan (Glavan Valley)

== Żabbar ==
- Wied Ta' Mazza (Mazza Valley)

== Żebbuġ, Gozo ==
- Wied l-Abjad (White Valley)
- Wied il-Qbajjar (Qbajjar Valley)
- Wied l-Infern (Infern Valley)
- Wied tal-Inżit (Nżit Valley)
- Wied ta' Marsalforn (Marsalforn Valley)
- Wied tal-Qliegħa (Qliegħa Valley)

== Żebbuġ, Malta ==
- Wied Ħesri (Ħesri Valley)
- Wied Inċita (Incita Valley)
- Wied il-Mofru (Mofru Valley)
- Wied is-Sewda (Sewda Valley)
- Wied Qirda (Qirda Valley)
- Wied ta' Baqqiegħa (Baqqiegħa Valley)
- Wied ta' Ħal Mula (Mula Valley)
- Wied ta' San Martin (St. Martin Valley)
- Wied tat-Troll (Troll Valley)

== Żejtun ==
- Ħajt il-Wied
- Wied tal-Kotob (Kotob Valley)
- Wied iż-Żiju (Żiju Valley)
- Wied iż-Żrinġ (Frog's Valley)

== Żurrieq ==
- Wied Babu (Babu Valley)
- Wied Ganu (Ganu Valley)
- Wied il-Fulija (Fulija Valley)
- Wied il-Qoton (Cotton Valley)
- Wied iż-Żurrieq (Żurrieq Valley)
- Wied Maqbul (Maqbul Valley)
- Wied Moqbol (Moqbol Valley)
