= List of rivers of Somalia =

This is a list of rivers in Somalia. This list is arranged by drainage basin, with respective tributaries indented under each larger stream's name.

== Indian Ocean ==
From south to north:

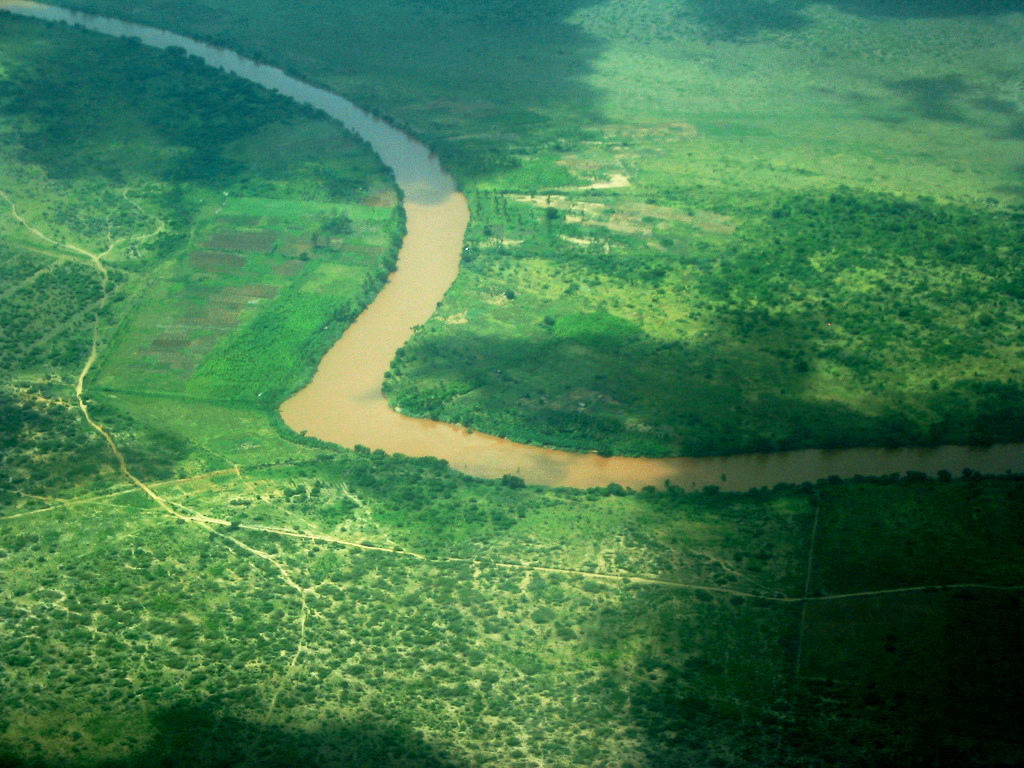
the Jubba river

- Bushbush (Buscbusc)
- Caannoole
- Baddana
- Jubba River
  - Lagh Dera
    - Lak Bor
      - Lagh Kutulo
      - Lagh Bissigh
    - Lagh Bogal
  - Shebelle River
    - Bohol Madagoi
  - Dudumey (Duddum)
  - Dawa River
- Eyl River (Nugaal, Nogel)
  - Togdheer River (Dheer, Der)
- Dhuudo (Dhud, Dudo))
- Tuddi
- Jaceyl (Jaceel, Giahel)
  - Dhud (Dahot)
- Jaceel (Giael)
- Hodmo
- Madgiid
- Biyoguure
- Baba
- Ceelcaanood
  - Faruur
- Bararis
- Durdur
- Silil
- Beyadé

== Interior ==
- Ban Dulad
