= Congue River =

River of mainland Equatorial Guinea

Coordinates: 1°04′00″N 9°40′59″E

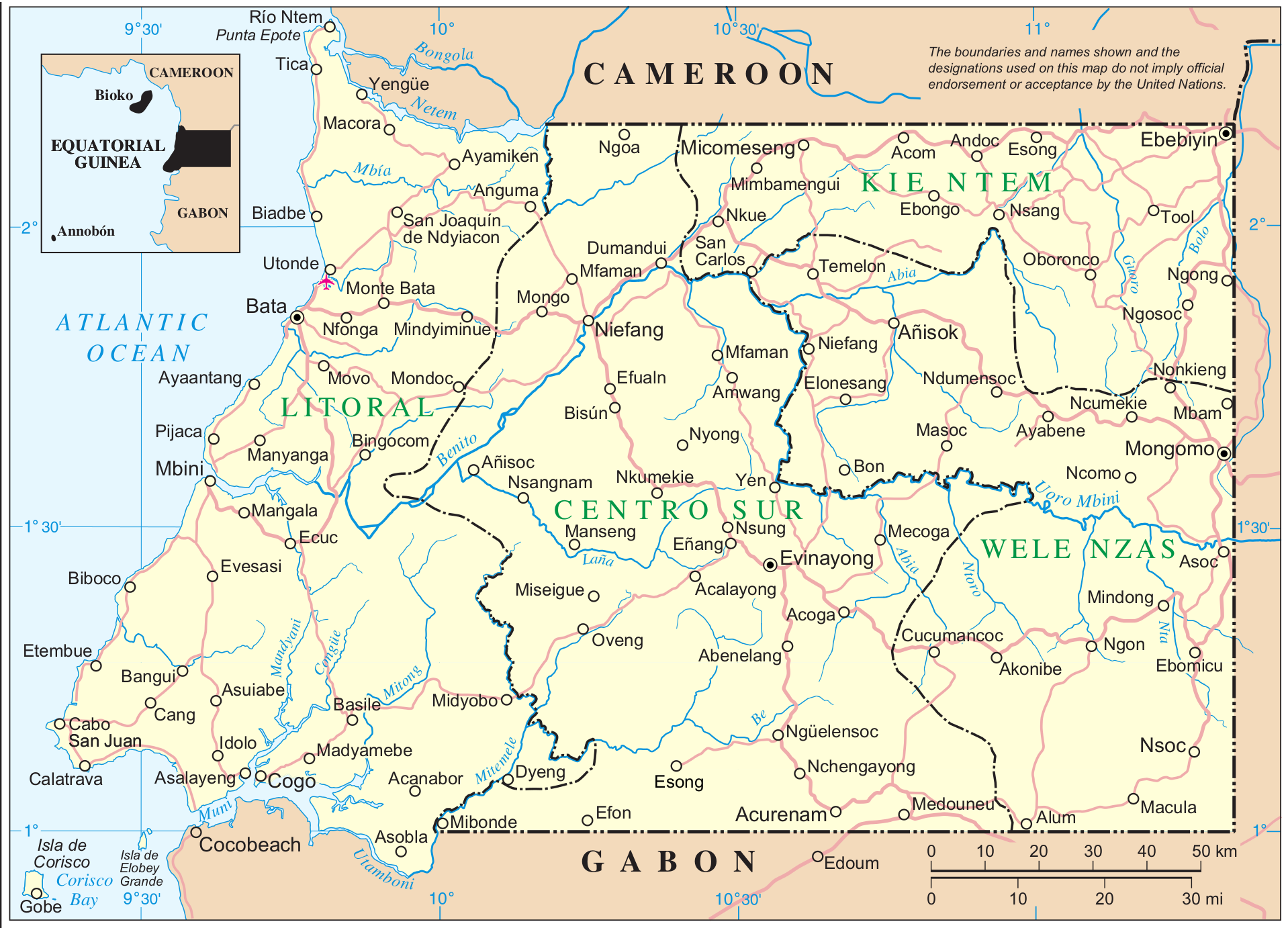
The river can be seen in the southwest, Click to view

The Congue is a river of southwestern mainland Equatorial Guinea. It forms part of the Muni Estuary along with the Mitong, Mandyani, Mitimele, Utamboni and Mven rivers.
