= List of largest unfragmented rivers =

This is a list of the largest river basins without fragmentation by dams in their catchments, ordered by average annual discharge.

To qualify for inclusion, a river must not only have no dams on its “main” stem, but also no dams on any tributary. For this reason, major world rivers such as the Amazon, Lena, Irrawaddy, Amur, and Fraser are disqualified because of dams on tributary streams.

Many of the rivers in this list have uncertain discharges. With the exception of those in Russia, streamgauges have seldom (if ever) been placed on the majority of the largest unfragmented river systems, due to the remoteness and/or ruggedness of the terrain in which they are located. Apart from the Fly which is clearly the largest, all ranks listed here are not perfectly certain, and there also exist a number of rivers in Sundaland that might qualify with reliable discharge data, such as the Kapuas.

Continent color key
Africa	Asia	Europe	North America	Oceania	South America

Annual discharge color key
Over 100 cubic kilometres (24 cu mi)	75 to 100 cubic kilometres (18 to 24 cu mi)	50 to 75 cubic kilometres (12 to 18 cu mi)	Less than 50 cubic kilometres (12 cu mi)

Rank	River	Basin countries	Length of longest channel	Drainage area	Average discharge (m^{3}/s)	Average annual discharge	Mouth	Notes
1	Fly	Papua New Guinea; Indonesia	1,050 kilometres (650 mi)	76,000 square kilometres (29,000 sq mi)	7,000 cubic metres per second (250,000 cu ft/s)	220 cubic kilometres (53 cu mi)	Gulf of Papua	Largest river with no dam in its catchment
2	Mamberamo	Indonesia	1,112 kilometres (691 mi)	78,992 square kilometres (30,499 sq mi)	5,500 cubic metres per second (190,000 cu ft/s)	170 cubic kilometres (41 cu mi)	Pacific Ocean	Indonesia's second largest river after the Kapuas.
3	Sepik	Papua New Guinea; Indonesia	1,126 kilometres (700 mi)	80,321 square kilometres (31,012 sq mi)	5,000 cubic metres per second (180,000 cu ft/s)	157.7 cubic kilometres (37.8 cu mi)	Pacific Ocean	Often regarded as largest completely pristine river system in the world
4	Pechora	Russia	1,809 kilometres (1,124 mi)	322,000 square kilometres (124,000 sq mi)	4,533 cubic metres per second (160,100 cu ft/s)	143.1 cubic kilometres (34.3 cu mi)	Arctic Ocean	Once the subject of a possible transfer of water into the Volga.
5	Atrato	Colombia	750 kilometres (470 mi)	38,600 square kilometres (14,900 sq mi)	4,140 cubic metres per second (146,000 cu ft/s)	131 cubic kilometres (31 cu mi)	Caribbean Sea	Some estimates place discharge much higher - possibly placing the Atrato second only to the Fly
6	Kaladan	Burma; India	350 kilometres (220 mi)	30,500 square kilometres (11,800 sq mi)	3,476 cubic metres per second (122,800 cu ft/s)	110 cubic kilometres (26 cu mi)	Bay of Bengal	Discharge estimated in absence of streamgauges. Dredging project by Indian and Myanmar governments.
7	Kikori	Papua New Guinea	320 kilometres (200 mi)	23,300 square kilometres (9,000 sq mi)	3,274 cubic metres per second (115,600 cu ft/s)	103 cubic kilometres (25 cu mi)	Gulf of Papua	
8	Khatanga	Russia (Krasnoyarsk Krai)	1,150 kilometres (710 mi)	364,000 square kilometres (141,000 sq mi)	3,200 cubic metres per second (110,000 cu ft/s)	101 cubic kilometres (24 cu mi)	Arctic Ocean	Most northerly large river system in the world, with northernmost tree line in basin.
9	Purari	Papua New Guinea	470 kilometres (290 mi)	33,670 square kilometres (13,000 sq mi)	3,000 cubic metres per second (110,000 cu ft/s)	95 cubic kilometres (23 cu mi)	Gulf of Papua	Hydroelectric dam proposed by Queensland government, so may need to be removed from list
10	Pyasina	Russia (Krasnoyarsk Krai)	818 kilometres (508 mi)	182,000 square kilometres (70,000 sq mi)	2,260 cubic metres per second (80,000 cu ft/s)	71 cubic kilometres (17 cu mi)	Arctic Ocean	Norilsk, most northerly city over 100,000, located on main stem of river.
11	Essequibo	Guyana; Venezuela	1,000 kilometres (620 mi)	69,000 square kilometres (27,000 sq mi)	2,213 cubic metres per second (78,200 cu ft/s)	70 cubic kilometres (17 cu mi)	Caribbean Sea	Largest completely unfragmented river flowing into Atlantic.
12	Anadyr	Russia	1,150 kilometres (710 mi)	191,000 square kilometres (74,000 sq mi)	2,020 cubic metres per second (71,000 cu ft/s)	64 cubic kilometres (15 cu mi)	Gulf of Anadyr	
13	Kuskokwim	Alaska (United States)	1,165 kilometres (724 mi)	120,000 square kilometres (46,000 sq mi)	1,900 cubic metres per second (67,000 cu ft/s)	60 cubic kilometres (14 cu mi)	Bering Sea	Largest unfragmented river in North America. Small dams exist on tributaries of Yukon, with which it shares a major delta.
14	Indigirka	Russia (Sakha)	1,726 kilometres (1,072 mi)	360,400 square kilometres (139,200 sq mi)	1,810 cubic metres per second (64,000 cu ft/s)	57 cubic kilometres (14 cu mi)	Arctic Ocean	Oymyakon, often thought of as the Northern Pole of Cold, located on main stem of river.
15	Great Tenasserim	Burma	300 kilometres (190 mi)	17,673 square kilometres (6,824 sq mi)	1,788 cubic metres per second (63,100 cu ft/s)	56 cubic kilometres (13 cu mi)	Andaman Sea	Discharge estimated in absence of streamgauges.
16	Copper	Alaska (United States)	460 kilometres (290 mi)	63,000 square kilometres (24,000 sq mi)	1,700 cubic metres per second (60,000 cu ft/s)	54 cubic kilometres (13 cu mi)	Pacific Ocean	
17	Stikine	Canada; Alaska (United States)	539 kilometres (335 mi)	52,000 square kilometres (20,000 sq mi)	1,600 cubic metres per second (57,000 cu ft/s)	51 cubic kilometres (12 cu mi)	Pacific Ocean	
18	Taz	Russia	1,401 kilometres (871 mi)	150,000 square kilometres (58,000 sq mi)	1,540 cubic metres per second (54,000 cu ft/s)	49 cubic kilometres (12 cu mi)	Kara Sea	
19	Courantyne	Suriname; Guyana	765 kilometres (475 mi)	69,000 square kilometres (27,000 sq mi)	1,500 cubic metres per second (53,000 cu ft/s)	47 cubic kilometres (11 cu mi)	Atlantic Ocean	
20	Susitna	Alaska (United States)	504 kilometres (313 mi)	63,400 square kilometres (24,500 sq mi)	1,400 cubic metres per second (49,000 cu ft/s)	44 cubic kilometres (11 cu mi)	Pacific Ocean	Hydropower dams proposed at present, so may not remain on list indefinitely
21	Thelon	Canada (Nunavut)	900 kilometres (560 mi)	239,332 square kilometres (92,407 sq mi)	1,380 cubic metres per second (49,000 cu ft/s)	44 cubic kilometres (11 cu mi)	Chesterfield Inlet	
22	Chari	Chad; Cameroon; Central African Republic	949 kilometres (590 mi)	548,747 square kilometres (211,872 sq mi)	1,200 cubic metres per second (42,000 cu ft/s)	38 cubic kilometres (9.1 cu mi)	Lake Chad	Only dryland river with discharge over 10 cubic kilometres (2.40 cu mi) not affected by dams.
23	Olenyok	Russia (Sakha)	2,270 kilometres (1,410 mi)	219,300 square kilometres (84,700 sq mi)	1,090 cubic metres per second (38,000 cu ft/s)	35 cubic kilometres (8.4 cu mi)	Arctic Ocean	
24	Kamchatka	Russia	758 kilometres (471 mi)	56,300 square kilometres (21,700 sq mi)	1,050 cubic metres per second (37,000 cu ft/s)	33 cubic kilometres (7.9 cu mi)	Pacific Ocean	
25	Laluai	Papua New Guinea (Bougainville Island)	35 kilometres (22 mi)	464 square kilometres (179 sq mi)	40 cubic metres per second (1,400 cu ft/s)	1.3 cubic kilometres (0.31 cu mi)	Pacific Ocean	Hydropower dams proposed at present, so may not remain on list permanently

== See also ==
- List of longest undammed rivers
