= Muni River =

Estuary of several rivers of Equatorial Guinea and Gabon

Coordinates: 1°1′10″N 9°35′20″E

Designations

Ramsar Wetland
- Official name: Reserva Natural del Estuario del Muni
- Designated: 2 June 2003
- Reference no.: 1311

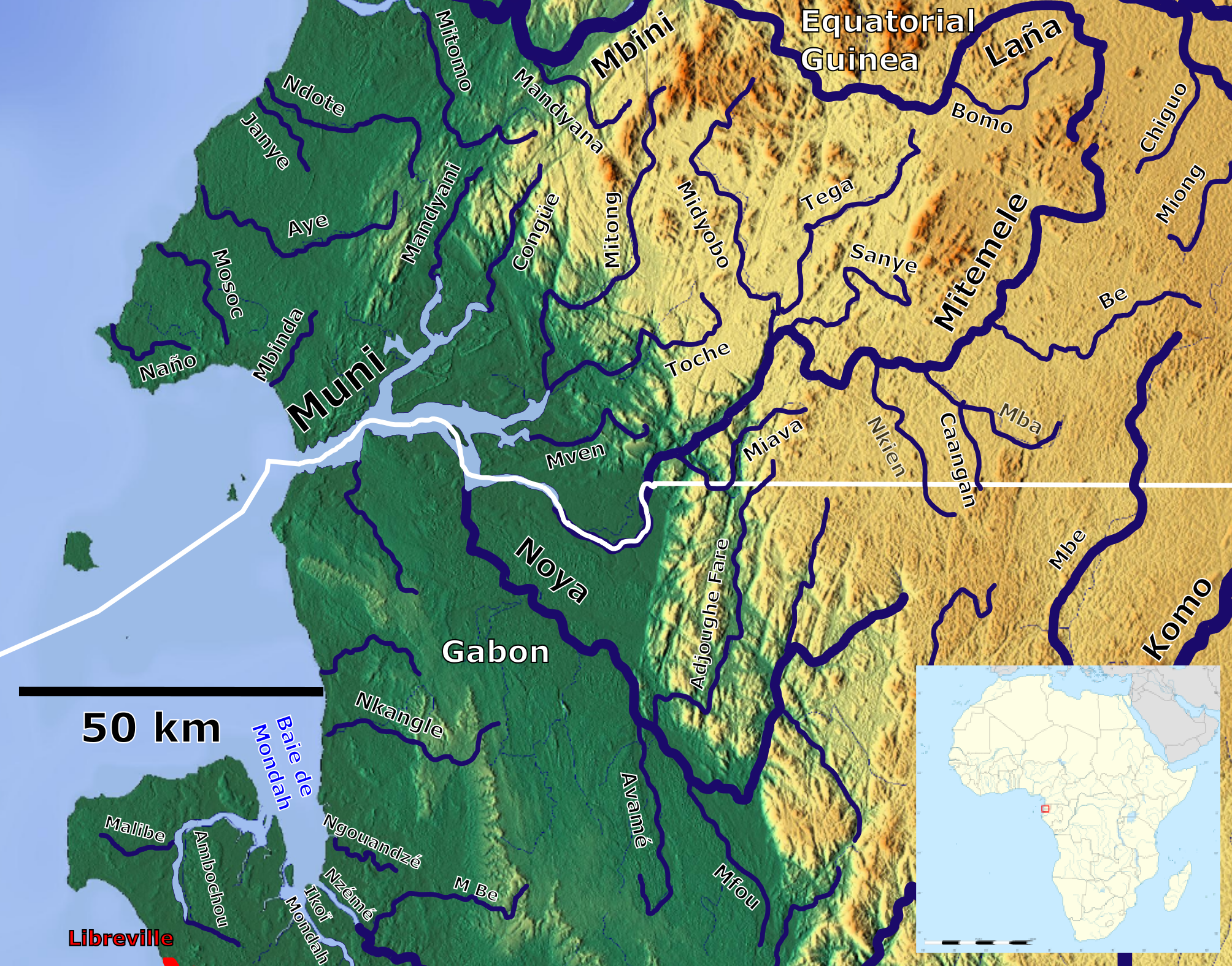
Muni estuary

The Muni (French: Rivière Muni, Spanish: Río Muni) is an estuary of several rivers of Equatorial Guinea and Gabon. Part of its length forms part of the border with Gabon. It is from this estuary that the former name for this part of Equatorial Guinea, Río Muni was taken.

== Hydrology ==
The estuary is fed in the north by the Congue and the Mandyani rivers and from the east by the Mitong, the Mven and the Timboni rivers (Mitimele, Utamboni).
