= List of rivers of Bangladesh =

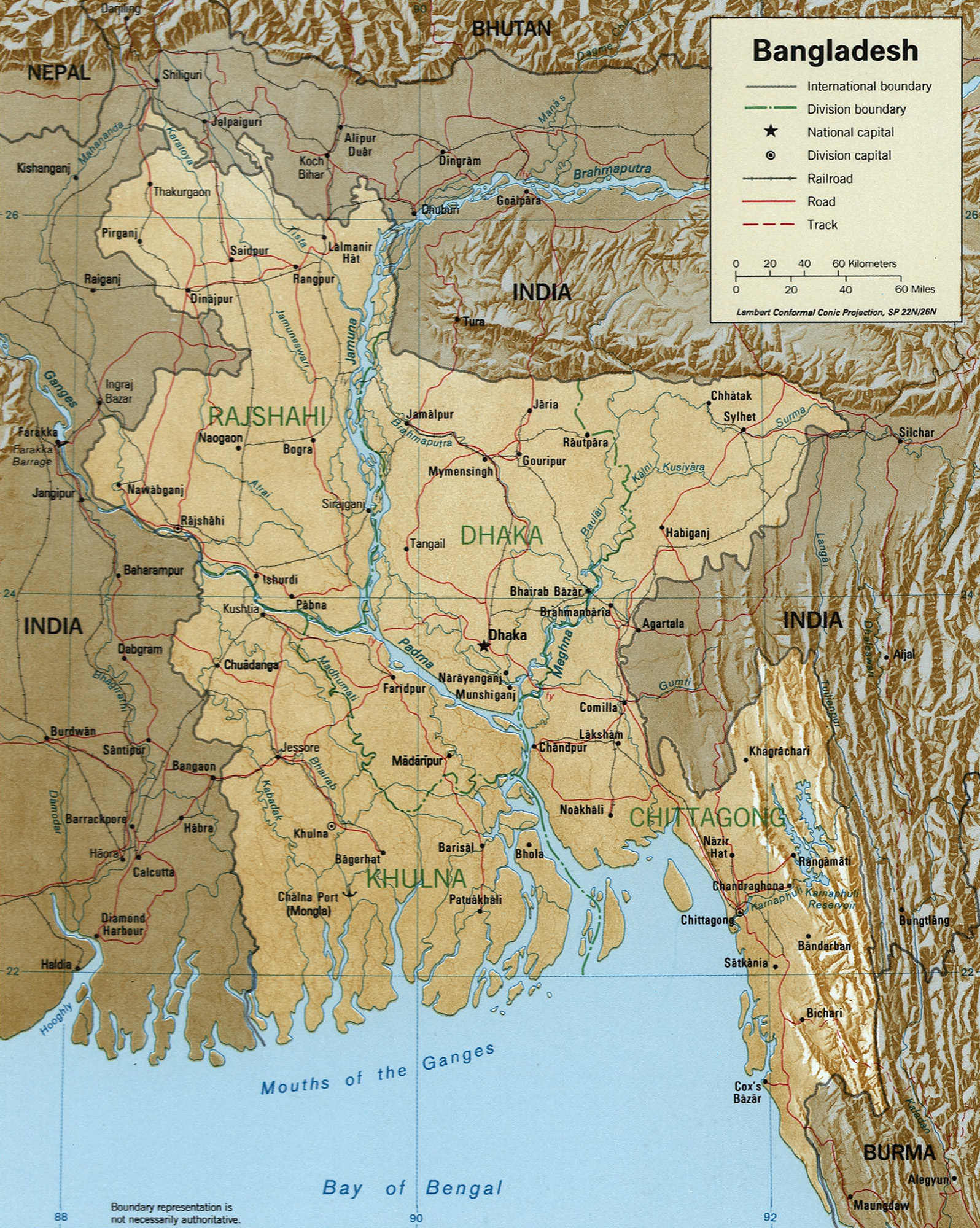
A map showing the major rivers in Bangladesh.

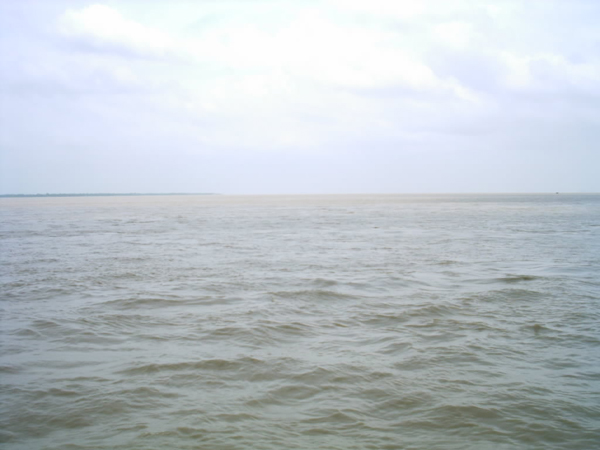
River Padma in Rainy Season

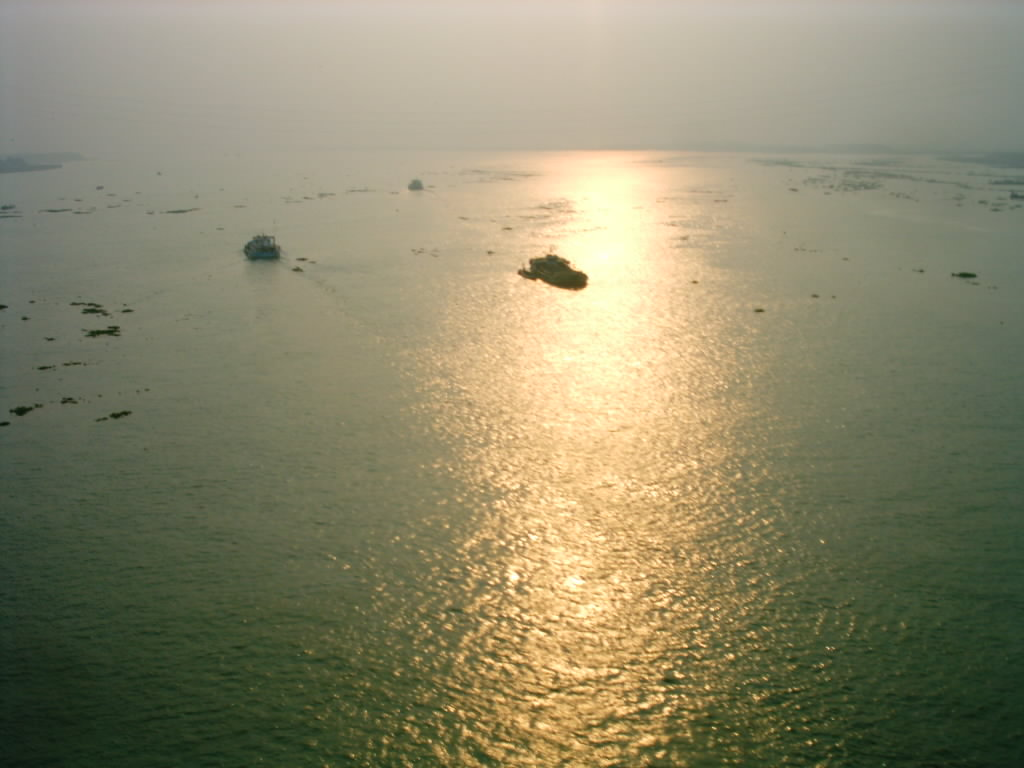
River Meghna as viewed from a bridge

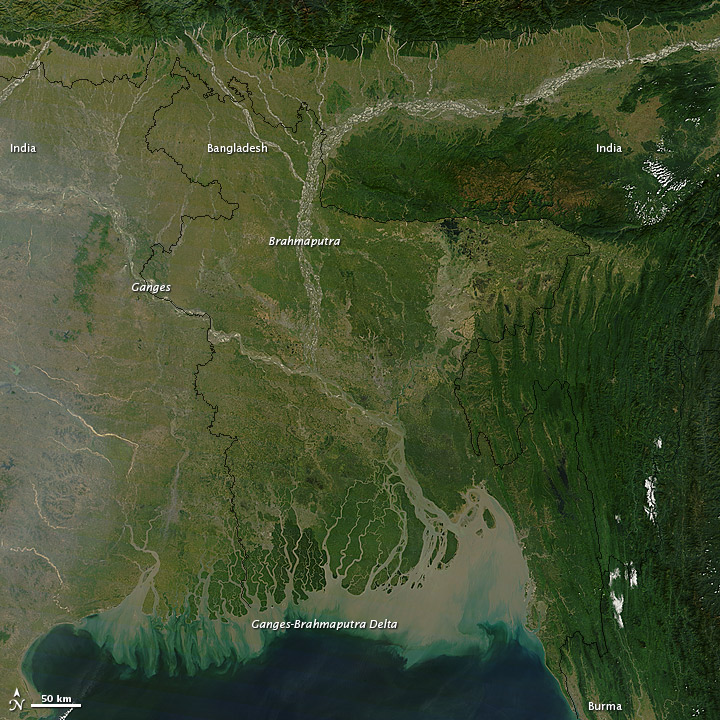
Ganges and Brahmaputra

According to Bangladesh Water Development Board (BWDB), about 907 rivers currently flow in Bangladesh (during summer and winter), although the numbers stated in some sources are ambiguous. As stated by a publication called Bāṅlādēśēr Nôd-Nôdī ('Rivers of Bangladesh') by BWDB, 310 rivers flow in the summer although they republished another study in 6 volumes where stated 405 rivers. The number differs widely due to lack of research on the counts and the fact that these rivers change flow in time and season. According to Banglapedia, 700 rivers flow in Bangladesh, but the information is old and obsolete. Although, historical sources state about 700 to 800 rivers, most of them have dried up or are extinct due to pollution and lack of attention. The numbers also differ because the same rivers may change names in different regions and through history.

A total of 60 international rivers flow through Bangladesh, 54 from India and 3 from Myanmar. The number of international rivers can be 58 as Brahmaputra is called nôd while the general term for river is nôdi. The gender division of rivers is interesting from history and mainly depending on the source of the river but not the size or flow briskness. Sangu and Halda are the only two internal rivers originated and finished within Bangladesh. Of the three major rivers, the Jamuna (part of the Brahmaputra) is the longest, Padma (eastern and main distributary of the Ganga) is the swiftest, and Meghna is the widest. There is an including tributaries flow through the country constituting a waterway of total length around 24,145 kilometres (15,003 mi). About 17 rivers are on the verge of extinction.

Bangladesh's geography and culture is influenced by the riverine delta system. Bangladesh lies in the biggest river delta of the world – the Ganges Delta system. Most of the country's land is formed through silt brought by the rivers.

== Major rivers ==
Name of River	District Covered by a River in Miles	Total length in Miles
Surma-Meghna	Sylhet (180), Comilla (146), Barisal (90)	221 miles (356 km)
Karatoya-Atrai-Gurgumari-Hursagar	Dinajpur (161), Rajshahi (160) & Pabna (50)	326 miles (525 km)
Donai-Charalkata-Jamuneswari-Karatoya	Rangpur (120) Bogra (98) & Pabna (62)	227 miles (365 km)
Padma (Ganges)	Rajshahi (90) Pabna (60) Dhaka (60) & Faridpur (80)	341 miles (549 km)
Garai-Madhumati-Baleswar	Kushtia (36) Faridpur (70) Jessore (91) Narail (84) Khulna (104) and Barisal (65)	233 miles (375 km)
Old Brahmaputra	Jamalpur,Sherpur,Mymensingh,Kishoreganj,Narsingdi(172)	150 miles (240 km)
Brahmaputra-Jamuna	Jamalpur, Bogra, Sirajganj, Tangail, Pabna (75)	94 miles (151 km)
Kapotaksha	Jessore (49) Khulna (112)	113 miles (182 km)
Banshi	Jamalpur (123) Tangail (25) Gazipur	115 miles (185 km)
Ghagat	Rangpur (247)	148 miles (238 km)
Dhanu-Boulai-Ghor	Sylhet (68), Mymensingh (78)	136 miles (219 km)
Nabaganga	Kushtia (16) Jessore (128)	144 miles (232 km)
Kushiyara	Sylhet (142)	143 miles (230 km)
Bhogai-Kangsa	Mymensingh (140)	141 miles (227 km)
Jamuna	Dinajpur (100) Bogra (29) Tangail (205)	56 miles (90 km)
Dakatia	Comilla (112) Noakhali (17)	69 miles (111 km)
Little Feni	Noakhali (59) Comilla (62)	50 miles (80 km)
Bhadra	Jessore (36) Khulna (84)	119 miles (192 km)
Betna-Kholpotua	Jessore (64) Khulna (55)	80 miles (130 km)
Sangu	Chittagong (50) and Chittagong Hill Tracts (58)	113 miles (182 km)
Chitra	Kushtia (12) Jessore (94)	97 miles (156 km)
Banar	Faridpur (96) Barisal (5)	101 miles (163 km)
Kumar (Faridpur Di)	Faridpur (101)	81 miles (130 km)
Punarbhaba	Dinajpur (50) Rajshahi (50)	100 miles (160 km)
Arial Khan	Faridpur (64) Barisal (36)	102 miles (164 km)
Dhaleswari	Mymensingh (100)	105 miles (169 km)
Bhairab	Jessore (81) Khulna (18)	136 miles (219 km)
Mathabhanga	Rajshahi (10), Kushtia (87)	81 miles (130 km)
Rupsa-Pasur	Khulna (88)	41 miles (66 km)
Karnaphuli	Chittagong H.T. (40) Chittagong (37)	100 miles (160 km)
Teesta	Rangpur (70)	71 miles (114 km)

Following is a list of some of the major rivers of Bangladesh:

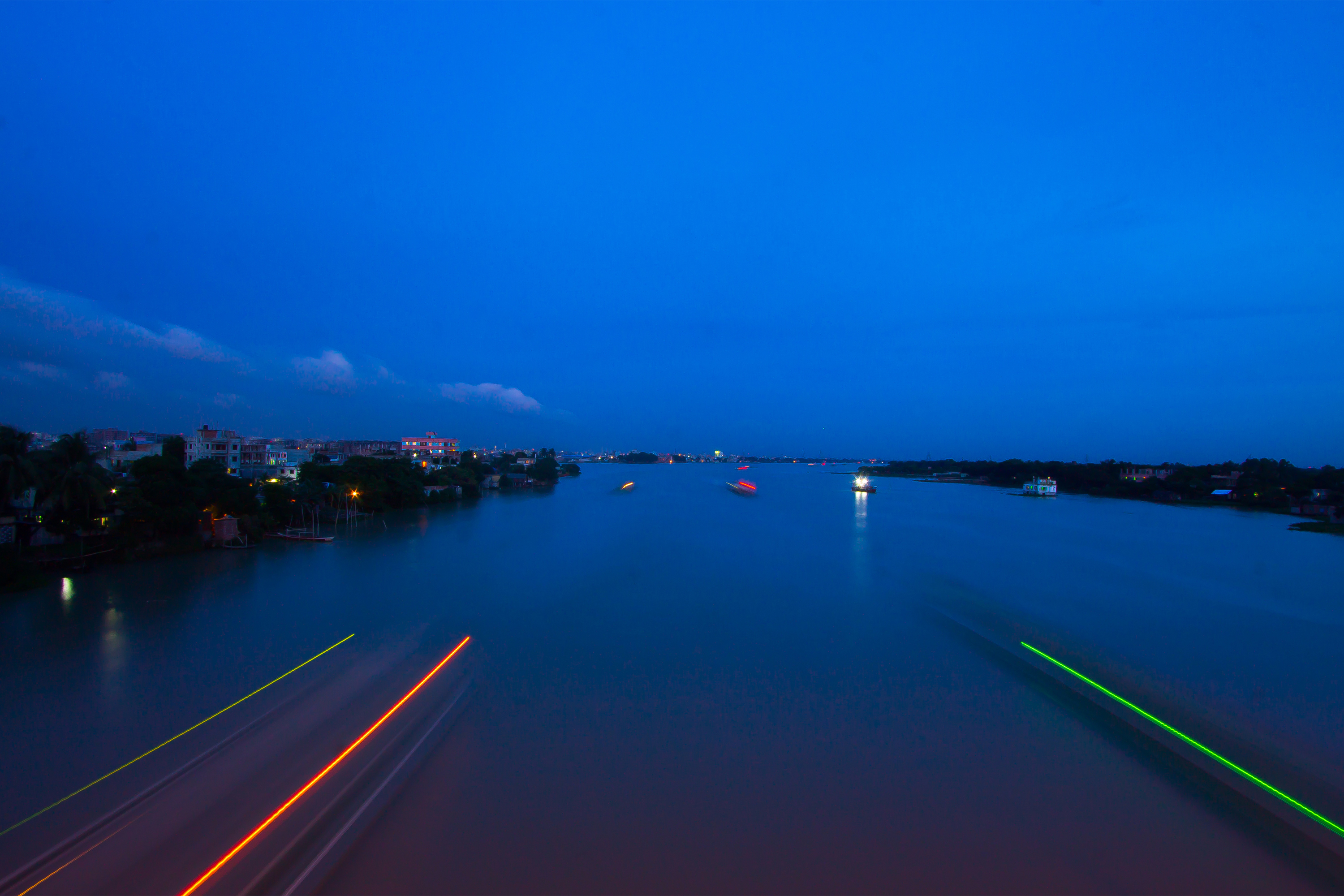
Evening at Buriganga River, Dhaka, Bangladesh

- Atrai River
- Arialkha River
- Balu River
- Bangali River
- Bangshi River
- Baral River
- Bhairab River
- Biskhali River
- Brahmaputra River (see section below)
- Bura Gauranga River
- Buriganga River
- Chiknai River
- Chitra River
- Dakatia River
- Dhaleshwari River
- Dhanshiri River
- Dhanu River
- Dharla River
- Dhepa River
- Feni River
- Ganges River (see section below)
- Garai River
- Gomoti River
- Gorai-Madhumati River
- Halda River
- Ichhamati River
- Jaldhaka River
- Jamuna River
- Jinai River
- Kaliganga River
- Kangsha River
- Karatoya River
- Karnaphuli River
- Kazipur River
- Khowai River
- Kirtankhola
- Kobadak River
- Kopothakho River
- Kumar River
- Kushiyara River
- Louhajang River
- Mahananda River
- Manu River, Tripura
- Madhumati River
- Mathabhanga River
- Meghna River
- Muhuri River
- Nabaganga River
- Naf River
- Nagar River (Rajshahi)
- Nagar River (Rangpur)
- Naleya River
- Padma River
- Punarbhaba River
- Pusur River
- Salda River
- Sangu River
- Shitalakshya River
- Surma River
- Teesta River
- Titas River
- Tulshiganga River
- Turag River
- Louhajang River

== Ganges-Brahmaputra Delta ==
Much of Bangladesh's geography is dominated by the Ganges-Brahmaputra Delta, but the term "Ganges" is not widely used for the larger river's main distributary within Bangladesh. Where it flows out of India, the Ganges' main channel becomes the Padma River. Similarly, below its confluence with the Teesta River, the main channel of the Brahmaputra River is known as the Jamuna River.

== Bogra District ==
There are quite a few rivers in the district of Bogra. Taking the Karatoya as the central dividing water-channel of the district, the other rivers may be classified into the eastern and the Western systems. The course of all the rivers is, with such allowances as must be made for beds and windings, nearly uniform north and south. The eastern rivers are Monas, Charkadaha and Khamati besides a few other smaller ones. Through the khiar tracts in the western parts of the district flow the Nagar, the Tulshiganga, Nagar and other minor streams. All the western rivers are the tributaries of the Atrai which itself flows into the Jamuna 19 kilometres (12 mi) north of the confluence of that river with the Ganges (padma) at Goalunda.

Evidences show that the rivers Karatoya and Nagar have changed their courses in the past, while the Jamuna, lying on the eastern boundary of the district, is in fact a new channel of the Brahmaputra. A very small river, Tarai used to occupy more or less the present location of the Jamuna. At that time the Brahmaputra used to flow to the east round the foot of the Garo Hills. The earliest evidence of the Brahmaputra river consists of a group of large Brahmaputra-size river scars which extend into the Sylhet basin flanking the southern edge of the Shillong plateau . The main river apparently extended east beyond this locality and then swung south into the Bay of Bengal. By the time of Rennell's mapping, this course had been abandoned in favour of a shorter route down what is still called the old Brahmaputra river past Mymensingh.

By the early 1770s the major diversion of the Brahmaputra into its present channel, west of the Madhupur jungle, had occurred. There is no complete agreement as to when this diversion down the Jenai river of Rennell occurred. Apparently by 1830 the diversion of low-river flow down the new channel was complete.

=== Rivers in Bogra District ===
1. Bangali River
2. Karatoya River
3. Nagar River
4. Jamuna River
5. Tulshiganga River
6. Isamoti River

== Khulna Division ==
- Baleshwar River
- Bhairab River
- Kapotaksha River
- Kholpetua River
- Mayur River
- Pasur River
- Rupsha River
- Jhopjhopiya River
- Shibsa River
- Chitra River

=== Rivers in Kushtia District ===
The rivers of the former Nadia district, of which Kushtia District was a part, were grouped together and known as "Nadia Rivers" because of the peculiar condition of the Nadia district and special measures taken by the government to keep them flowing. All the rivers of the former Nadia district (and of the present Kushtia District) were offshoots of the Padma (lower Ganges). But at one time when the Ganges found its way to the sea along the course of the Bhagirathi, there must have been some earlier streams to carry the drainage of the Darjeeling-Himalayas to the sea. Bhairab is said to be one of those streams. Later the Ganges drifted to the east and the Padma grew mighty, taking all the drainage of northern and upper Bengal.

1. Padma River
2. Bhairab River
3. Bhodra River
4. Mathabhanga River
5. Kobadak River
6. Garai River
7. Kaliganga River
8. Icchamati River (Pabna)

== Mymensingh District ==
The Jamuna, nowhere less than 4 miles wide during rain, runs in the west and the equally important Meghna encloses the district on the east. They are connected by the old channel of the Brahmaputra running through the centre of the district in a south-easterly direction from above Bahadurabad up to Bhairab Bazar.

=== Rivers in Mymensingh District ===
1. Dhanu River
2. Kangsha River
3. Jinai River
4. Brahmaputra River
5. Pakhria

== Noakhali District ==
The district of Noakhali is not intersected by as many rivers as the other deltaic districts of Bangladesh. On the western and southern parts of the district and between the islands flows the Meghna with all its bifurcations each of which is much larger than an ordinary river, and on the east the Feni subdivision is drained by the great and little Feni rivers. In the intervening country there are no rivers of any size and the drainage there depends on a few tidal channels or khals, of which the principal are the Noakhali khal, the Mahendra Khal and the Bhowaniganj Khal.

In sharp contrast with the mainland to its south, there is a network of khals in the islands. As one advances from the older formation of chars towards the newer ones, the number of khals gradually increases. The khals gradually silt up, but where diluvion goes on, new khals come into existence and the old ones become wider and wider.

=== Rivers in Noakhali District ===
1. Meghna River
2. Bhawaniganj Khal
3. Mahendrak Khal River
4. Noakhali Khal
5. Little Feni River
6. Feni River
7. Muhuri River
8. Selonia River

== Pabna District ==
The district is intersected by rivers of varying magnitude. But in fact, the river system is constituted by the Padma and the Jamuna with their interlacing offshoots and tributaries. Besides these flowing streams, the interior is visited by the abandoned beds of old rivers, most of which are dry except in the rains.

The general trend of the drainage of the Serajganj subdivision is from north-west to south-east, the rivers entering it from the north-west flow into the Jamuna after a tortuous course. In the Sadar subdivision, however, the general slope of the country is from west to east, and the main rivers fall into the Hurasagar, a tributary of the Jamuna.

=== Rivers in Pabna District ===
1. Padma River
2. Ichhamati River
3. Baral River
4. Atrai River
5. Chiknai River
6. Jamuna River
7. Kazipur River
8. Karatoya River
9. Kageshwari Bridge

== Rajshahi District ==
Excepting the Ganges or the Padma, the Mahananda and the Atrai, the rivers of Rajshahi district are of little hydrographic importance. For, most of the rivers are more or less moribund, that is, they are not active flowing streams except during the rainy season. During the rainy season these moribund rivers act as excellent drainage channels draining off a large volume of water and have a considerable current. Most of these rivers are narrow and flow in well-defined channels.

=== Principal rivers in Rajshahi District ===
1. Padma River
2. Mahananda River
3. Atrai River
4. Gur River
5. Jamuna River
6. Baral River
7. Musakhan River
8. Nandakuja River
9. Gumani River
10. Baralai River
11. Narad River

== Tangail District ==
Tangail District is flanked on the west by the mighty river Jamuna, which is nowhere less than 4 miles wide during the rainy season. The Dhaleshwari, first an old channel of the Ganges and then of the Brahmaputra, cuts across the south-western corner of the district on its powerful sweep to join the Meghna near Narayanganj. The old name of Dhaleshwari was "Gajghata". It used to flow afterwards by the Salimabad Channel and then at last by Porabari Channel. A part of the eastern boundary of the district runs close to the Banar River. The river Bangshi flows almost down the middle of the district, branching out from the old Brahmaputta to the north from near Jamalpur. Bangshi falls into Dhaleswari near Savar, in Dhaka district. The Bangshi forms a natural barrier to the Madhupur Jungle on the Tangail side, all the way from Madhupur to Mirzapur. It is fordable at only two or three places near Basail on its my to river Meghna. Dhaleswari itself however takes out from the Jamuna from inside Tangail district.

Among other important rivers of the district, Lohajang is worth mentioning. It flows past the district headquarters of Tangail and is almost dead at present (in moribund condition). Other rivers are Khiru, Nanglai, Atia, and Jhinai. The old Brahmaputra's most important offshoot is the Jhinai; striking off near Jamalpur it rejoins the Jamuna north of Sarishabari, while another branch flows past Gopalpur. Now these sub-systems of rivers, viz, Bangshi and Banar, and the Lohajang, Khiru, Nangtai, Atia and Jhinai are all dying out because of the shift of the old Brahmaputra river from its former channel to the present Jamuna channel.

The most important question in connection with the river system of Tangail vis-a-vis Mymensingh district is when and why the Brahmaputra River changed its main old channel. During the last 150 years or so, this diversion of the old Brahmaputra to its present Jamuna channel has considerably prompted the geographers and geologists to enquire deep into it. Two theories are advanced: As explanation of the diversion, one theory describes the gradual uplift of the Madhupur Tract and a final trigger action of the Teesta diversion in 1787 as the chief factor; and the other theory states that the Brahmaputra diversion resulted directly from a major increase in its volume of water due to beheading of the Tsangpo river of Tibet by Dihang, a tributary of the then small Brahmaputral. It has now been proved that the great Tibetan river Tsangpo joined the Brahmaputra about 1780 and this accession was more important than the Teesta floods in deciding the Brahmaputra to try a shorter way to the sea.

With the help of Major James Rennell's maps (1764 to 1773) and of the Revenue Survey it is possible to reconstruct the history of the Bengal Delta and its river systems. It was Rennell who carried out the first ever accurate cadastral surveys and laid the basis for the geographical study of Bengal. At the end of the 18th century, probably as a result of the great Tista floods in 1787, the Brahmaputra changed its course and joined the Padma at Goulundo. No piece-meal study of an intricate river system is possible, without distortion and inadequacy.

Even though we assume that the change in the course of the main waters of the old Brahmaputra took place suddenly in 1787, the year of the famous flooding of the Teesta river, the Teesta has been always a wandering river, sometimes joining the Ganges, sometimes being shifted outwards by the superior strength of the river Ganges and forced to join the Brahmaputra at last.

Whatever might have been the cause, by 1830, the diversion of old Brahmaputra was complete, ushering in a gradual but radical change in the river system of the Tangail district. The old channel of the Brahmaputra had been reduced to its present insignificance.

In 1850 Sir Joseph Hooker wrote "we are surprised to hear that within the last 20 years the main channel of Brahmaputra had shifted its course westwards, its eastern channel silted up so rapidly that the Jamuna eventually became the principal stream.

=== Rivers in Tangail District ===
1. Jamuna River (205 km)
2. Bangshi River (238 km)
3. Pungli River
4. Louhajang River
5. Dhaleshwari River (160 km)

== See also ==
- List of Bangladesh-India transboundary rivers
