= Kazipur River =

Location
- Countries: Bangladesh
- District: Sirajganj

Physical characteristics
- Source
  - location: Jamuna River
- Mouth
  - location: Ichamoti river

Kazipur River (Bengali: কাজীপুর নদী) flows through Kazipur Upazila in Sirajganj District, Bangladesh. It then flows south and joins the Ichamati River.

The Kazipur is a small offshoot of the Jamuna River that departs from the main river in the northernmost part of Kazipur. The river then flows south through Kazipur and reaches its confluence with the Ichamati in Sirajganj Sadar Upazila.

The Kazipur River historically flowed past the Kazipur Police Station.

The combined waters of the Kazipur and the Ichamati flow south via a winding course through Sirajganj Sadar Upazila until they enter the Karatoya River at Nalka (Nalkaseganj), an important commercial centre at the junction of the two main inland waterways of Raiganj Upazila.

== See also ==
- List of rivers of Bangladesh
