= Chiknai River =

Coordinates: 24.1233°N 89.3479°E

Location
- Country: Bangladesh
- Division: Rajshahi
- Districts: Natore and Pabna

Physical characteristics
- Source: Khalshidingi River
- Mouth: Atri River
- Length: 57 km (35 mi)

The Chiknai River (Bengali: চিকনাই), also known as the Dangha, is located in Bangladesh in the beels west of Chatmohor in Pabna District.

== Early history ==
The Chiknai receives an excess of flood water from the Padma during the rains and falls into the Baral near the village of Faridpur in Pabna district. It is navigable in the rainy season, and in the dry season it forms a good fishery, supplying Pabna and other places with fish.

The Jamuna forms the eastern boundary of the district for a length of 130 kilometres (80 mi), separating Pabna from the districts of Mymensingh, Tangail and Dhaka. The present channel of the Jamuna is of comparatively recent origin and is due to the diversion of the Brahmaputra through the Jenai which was a small river, more or less, at the present position of the Jamuna.

When Rennell compiled his map of Bengal towards the close of the 18th century, the main stream of the Brahmaputra bent sharply round the range of the Garo Hills and flowed in a south-easterly direction across the district of Mymensingh to join the Meghna just below Bhairab Bazar. About the beginning of the 19th century the Brahmaputra having raised its bed and lost its velocity was no longer able to hold its own course against the Meghna mentioned above. So it left its old channel and broke to the west, capturing the waters of the Teesta on the way and cut out a new channel for itself, which is practically its present channel.

Even at the beginning of the 19th century, the original channel through the Mymensingh district had become of secondary importance, and at the present time, though it bears the name of Brahmaputra, it has dwindled into a mere watercourse navigable only during the rainy season. In 1850 British explorer Joseph Dalton Hooker, while travelling to Dhaka, described this great change as follows:

A few miles beyond Pabna we passed from a narrow canal at once into the main stream of the Burrampooter at Jaffarganj; our maps had led us to expect that it flowed fully seventy miles to the eastwards in this latitude; and we were surprised to hear that within the last twenty years the main body of that river had shifted its course thus far to the westward. This alteration was not effected by the gradual working westward of the main stream, but by the old eastern channel so rapidly silting up as to be now unnavigable, while the Jammul (the river referred to is the Jamuna) which receives the Teesta and which is laterally connected by branches with the Burrampooter become consequently wider and deeper, and eventually the principal stream.
