= Bura Gauranga River =

River in Bangladesh

Coordinates: 22.000°N 90.550°E

The Bura Gauranga River and sea channel are located in the Patuakhali district of Barisal Division in south-central Bangladesh.

== See also ==
- List of rivers in Bangladesh
