= Bangali River =

Coordinates: 24°51′N 89°34′E

Bangali River Ghaghot River
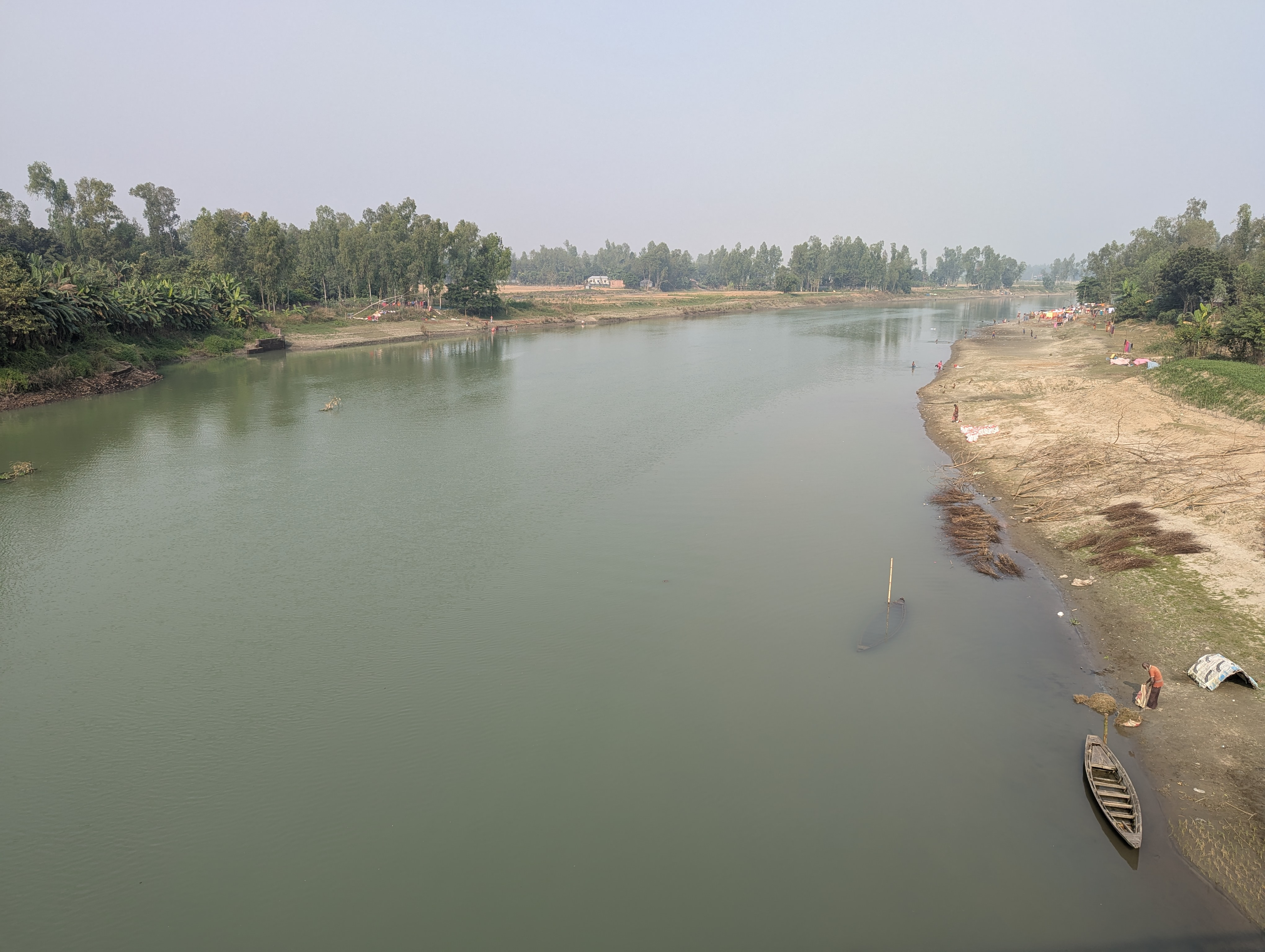

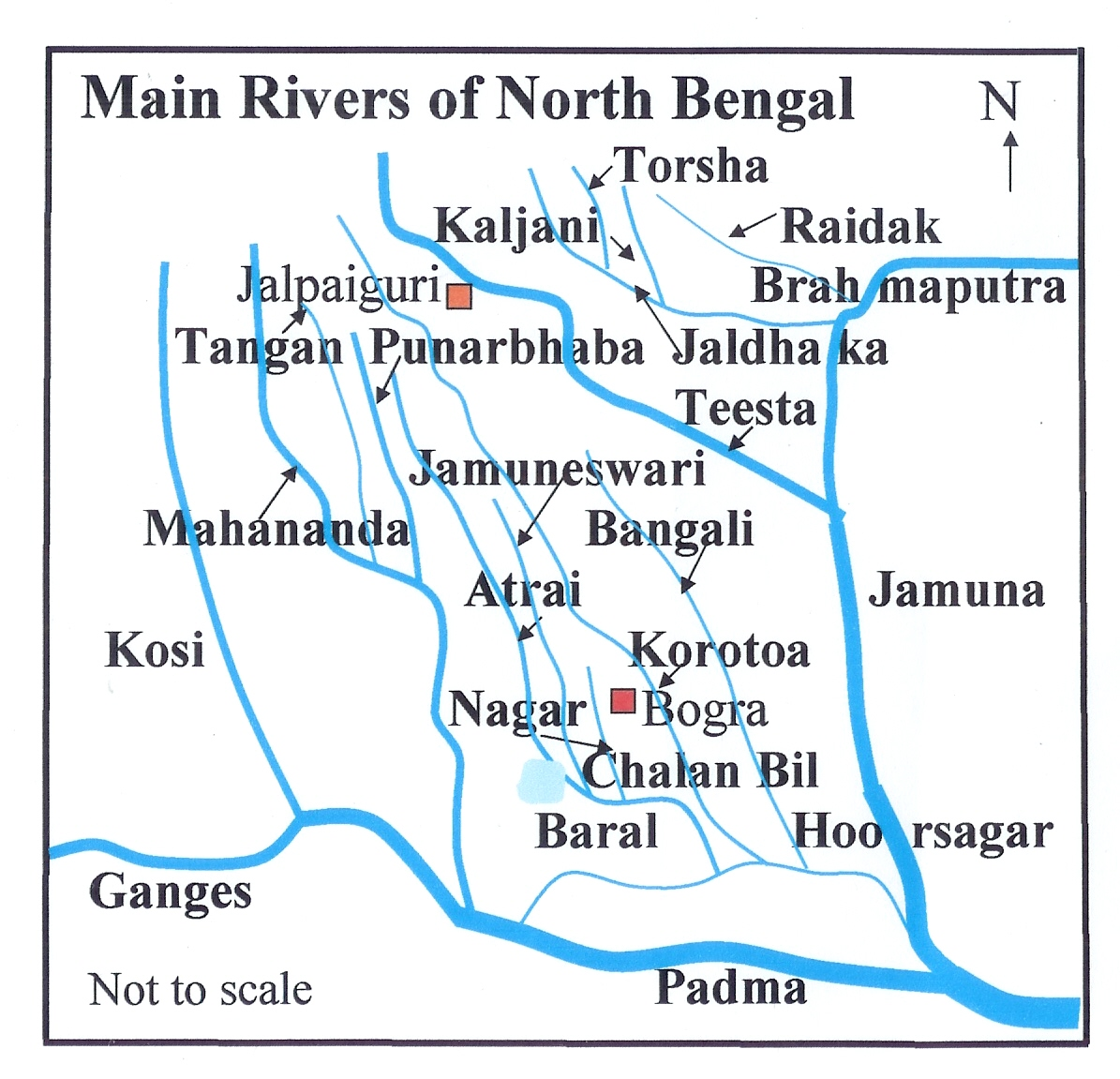

Location
- Country: Bangladesh
- Division: Rajshahi

Physical characteristics
- Source: Teesta River
- Discharge
  - location: Jamuna River, Karatoya River

The Bangali River (Bengali: বাঙালি নদী) is one of the main rivers in northern Bangladesh (commonly known as North Bengal). There is the possibility that it might merge with the Jamuna River, which could lead to major changes in the geography of the region.

== Etymology ==
In the latter part of the 18th century, movements against the British Raj erupted in North Bengal. Two of the major centers of the Fakir-Sanyasi Rebellion were Bogra District and Rangpur, located on both sides of the Bangali River. Whether this was the reason that prompted the name Bangali (the people of Bengal) is still unknown.

== Geography ==
The Bangali River originates as a distributary of Teesta River in Nilphamari District. The river flows as the Ghaghot River from its source to Gaibandha, where it splits into two branches —one moves towards the west as the "Ghaghot" and empties into the Karatoya River at Sherpur, Bogra District; the other section of the Bangali River flows to the south and subsequently breaks into two sections in Bogra. These two sections join the Jamuna and Karatoa.

There are a number of distributaries of the Bangali River such as the Belal, Manosh, Modhukhali, Ichamoti, and Volka among others. These distributaries often dry up in the winter season.

Recently, with a gradual decrease in the flow of the Teesta River, the Jamuna has become the main source of water for the Bangali River. Some scientists, including former executive director of the River Research Institute, Abdul Wajed, consider the Jamuna to be the primary source of the river.

Similar to other rivers in the region, the Bangali undergoes several divisions and receives multiple tributaries. According to the Bogra District Gazetteer, the Bangali River flows through Sariakandi Upazila to the south east and reaches Chou-Ghata. Thereafter, at Jurigacha, it splits into two major branches. The western branch named Hal-Halia flows towards the south passing across Bogra, Sherpur and Dhunat Upazila. The eastern branch continues as the Bangali River through Dhunat Thana. At Bathuabari in Dhunat, the two branches meet again and the conjoined flow continues by the name of "Fuljhur", which turns towards the west near South Pantabari and arrives at a place called Kachari Kallyani. The name of the stream changes here to Khanpur Mohona which soon drains into the Karatoa. From there, the combined Bangali–Karatoa flows by Modhiabagh, Himabari and Sherpur.

== History ==
The present-day streams of Jamuna and Teesta were created after a massive flood in 1787. The flood had a major impact on the geography of rivers in the region; several rivers changed course, and the changes continued for the next forty years. Prior to the flood, the Brahmaputra River used to pass through Mymensingh and Bhoirob Bazaar to meet the Meghna River. After 1787, the Brahmaputra changed its course to drain into the Padma River.

Along with changes in course, the Jamauna and Teesta also gave rise to new distributaries in the aftermath of the 1787 flood. It is speculated that the Bangali River was born out of those changes of course of the Jamuna and Teesta.

== Concerns ==
The Jamuna is inherently unstable. It has changed its course before, and is likely to do so again, possibly abruptly. Every year, by eroding its banks, it moves an average of 80 m (262 ft) closer to the Bangali. In the 1987 flood, it threateened to break into the channel of the Bangali north of Serajganj. In 1993, the two rivers were less than 1 kilometre (0.62 mi) apart at their closest approach. As of 2007, a stretch of only 300 m (984 ft) separated the two.

Authorities are concerned about the potential natural realignment of the Jamuna into the channel of the Bangali. It could trigger catastrophic flooding. An area of 1,000 square kilometres and 9 m (30 ft) of Bogra and Sirajganj would be completely submerged under water. Water would destroy the Bogra–Nagarbari road and eventually cause the Bangabandhu Bridge over the Jamuna to be ineffective. It would increase annual flooding in the floodplain of Bangali River. Location: 24 50 41 N 89 50 41 E
