= Jhenai River =

River in Bangladesh

Coordinates: 24.6458°N 89.8504°E

The Jhenai River is located in Bangladesh. It forms as an offshoot of the old channel of the Brahmaputra River, most of the water of which now flows through the Jamuna. The Jhenai bifurcates, with the main branch joining the Jamuna south of Sarishabari in Jamalpur District and the other branch flowing south in Tangail District.
