= Muhuri River =

River in Bangladesh

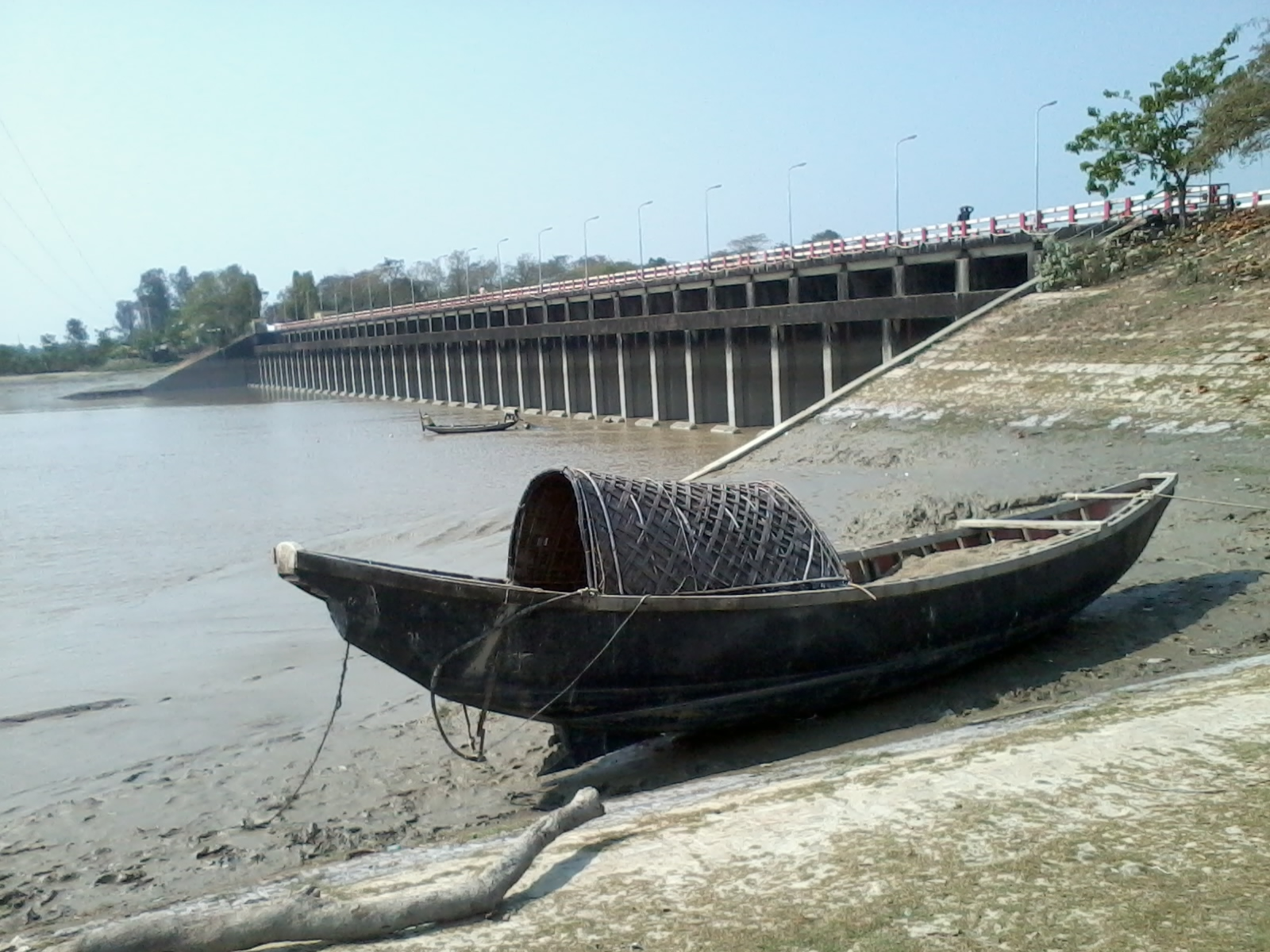

Location
- Country: India, Bangladesh
- State: Tripura

Physical characteristics
- Source: Lushai Hills
  - location: Tripura
  - coordinates: 23.2811°N 91.7208°E
- Mouth
  - coordinates: 22.9109°N 91.5014°E
- Discharge
  - location: Feni

The Muhuri is a transnational river that flows in India and Bangladesh. Rising in Tripura, it flows into Bangladesh where it merges with the Feni near the latter's mouth to the Bay of Bengal. The Muhuri is also known as the Little Feni.

== Course of the river ==
The Muhuri rises in the Lushai Hills of Tripura and flows west into Bangladesh which it enters in the Parshuram upazila of Feni district. In Bangladesh, the river separates the Feni and Chittagong districts before flowing out into the Bay of Bengal.

=== Indo-Bangladesh border ===
The Muhuri acts as part of the border between India and Bangladesh in the Tripura-Noakhali sector. However, the frequently changing course of the river prevented the two nations from demarcating the boundary here with India insisting on the 1974 Accord with Bangladesh that calls for demarcation "along the mid-stream of the course of Muhuri river at the time of demarcation" while Bangladesh insisted on an 1893 map that would result in it gaining an extra 44 acres.

==== Muhurichar ====
Muhurichar river island, a 140-acre island on the river and important for rice cultivation, was a source of tension between the two countries as both laid claim to it and it resulted in skirmishes between the border security forces of Bangladesh and India on several occasions, including in 1976, 1979 and 1985 and 1999. In 2011 during the visit of Prime Minister Manmohan Singh to Bangladesh, both countries agreed to the demarcation of the land boundary between them. The two parties agreed on the demarcation of the boundary along the Muhuri and also agreed to construct embankments along the river within their borders to stabilize it and to undertake fencing along the 'zero line' in the sector.

== Hydrology ==
The Muhuri has a total basin area of 839 km^{2} in Tripura which accounts for 8% of the state's total geographical area. It has an annual flow of 76,247,000 cubic meters of water which amounts to 9.6% of Tripura's total river flows. In Bangladesh, the Muhuri basin covers an area of 40,080 hectares spread across the upazilas of Feni Sadar, Sonagazi, Chhagalnaiya and Parshuram in Feni district and the Mirersarai Upazila of Chittagong district with a total irrigable area of a little over 23,000 hectares. The river is known for its wild nature and flash floods and its frequent changes in course. For the most part, the Muhuri has a width of 150 to 200 meters which increases as it nears the sea. As it nears the sea, it comes under the increasing influence of tidal action. The river is quite shallow and navigable by 4-tonne boats for only half the year and it is possible to ford it during the lean season.

== Waterworks ==
The Government of India built an impermeable spur on the river before 1975 to protect the town of Belonia from riverine erosion. The Joint River Commission has since restrained either country from constructing them on the river. The Muhuri Irrigation Project, consisting of a closure dam and a 20-vent regulator, was completed by Bangladesh in 1986 to provide irrigation facilities and to check the inflow of saline water into the river from the Bay of Bengal. The Muhuri empties into the Feni at the reservoir formed by the building of the closure dam from where water is taken out through irrigation canals. The project has helped develop inland fisheries, curbed the incursion of saline water upriver and kept upstream areas safe from storm surges following cyclones.

== See also ==
- List of rivers of India
- List of rivers of Bangladesh
