= Banar River =

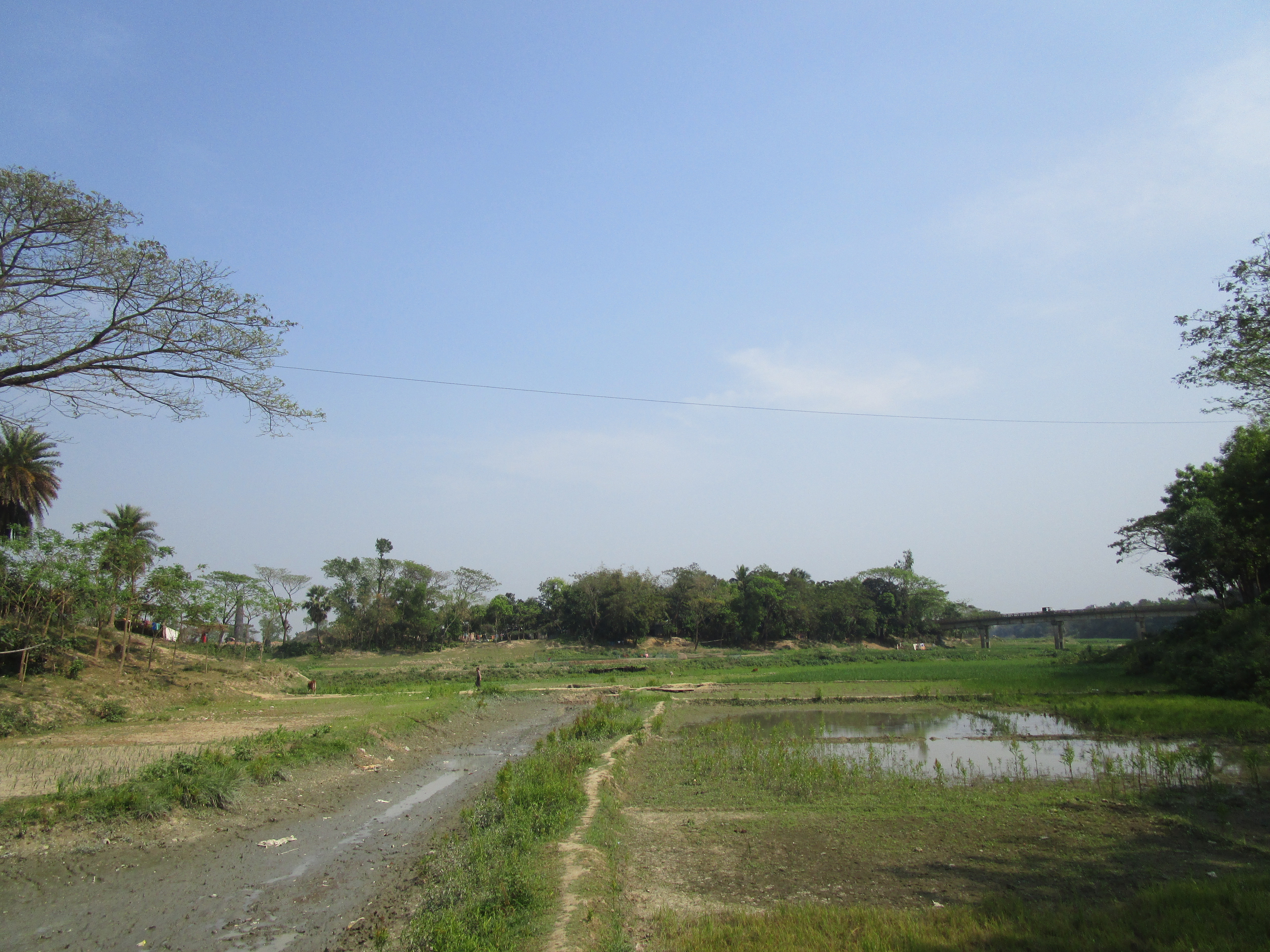

- Location in Bangladesh

Location
- Country: Bangladesh
- Division: Dhaka Division
- Districts: Faridpur; Jamalpur; Mymensingh

Physical characteristics
- Source: Old Brahmaputra River
- Mouth: Khiro River
  - coordinates: 24°04′23″N 90°38′01″E

The Banar (Bengali: বানার নদী) is a river in Faridpur, Jamalpur and Mymensingh in north-central Bangladesh.
