= Hurasagar River =

River in Bangladesh

Coordinates: 24°00′N 89°38′E

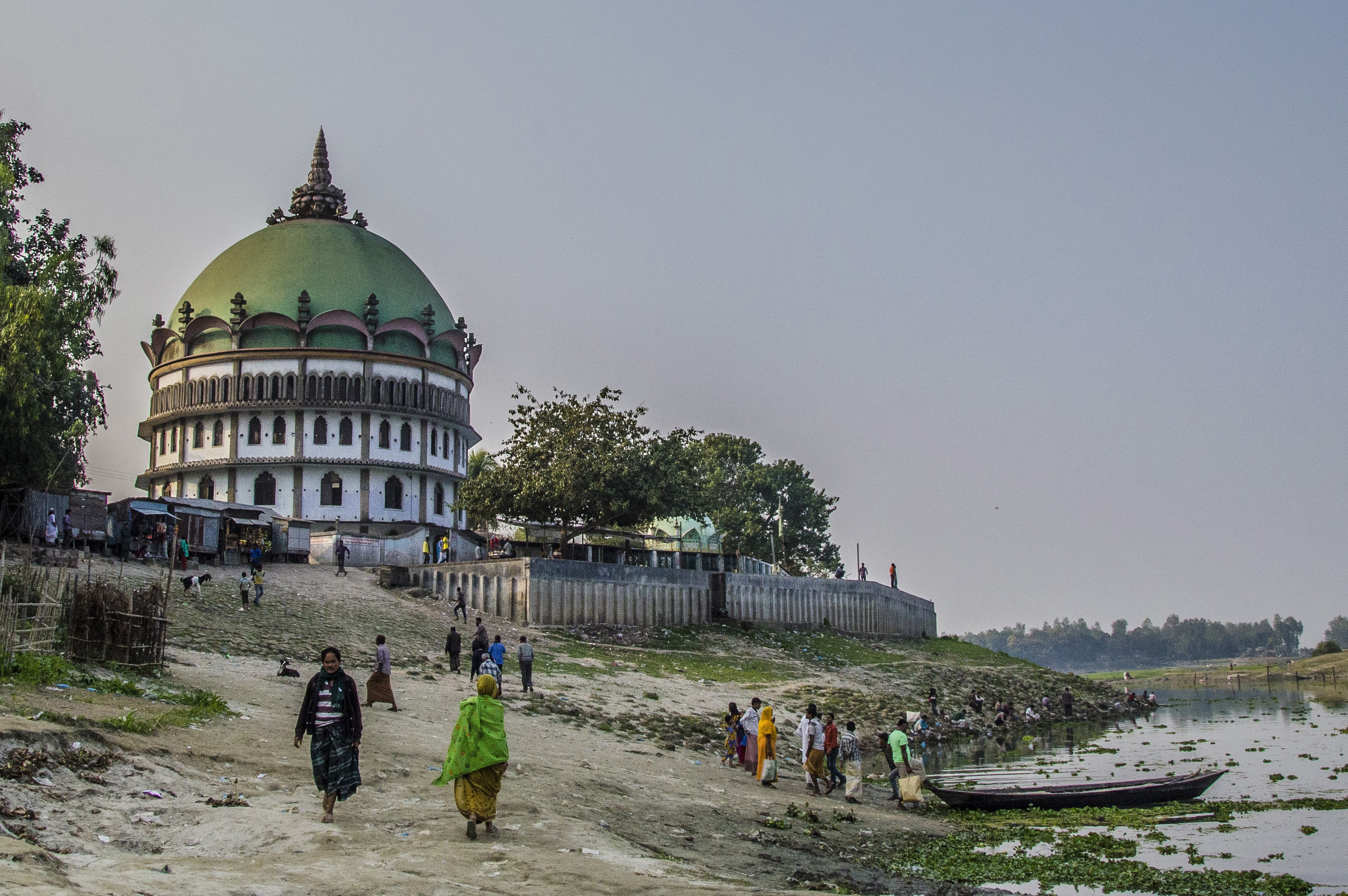
Tomb of Hazrat Makhdum Shah Doula on the west bank of Hurasagar River

The Hurasagar River, or Hoorsagar, is a major river of Bangladesh that formerly flowed into the Ganges, but now joins the Jamuna. It receives water from the Baral, the Phuljhar (which is the combination of the Karatoya and the Bangali rivers).

The Hurasagar is joined to the Ichhamati River by a system of locks.
