= Khiro River =

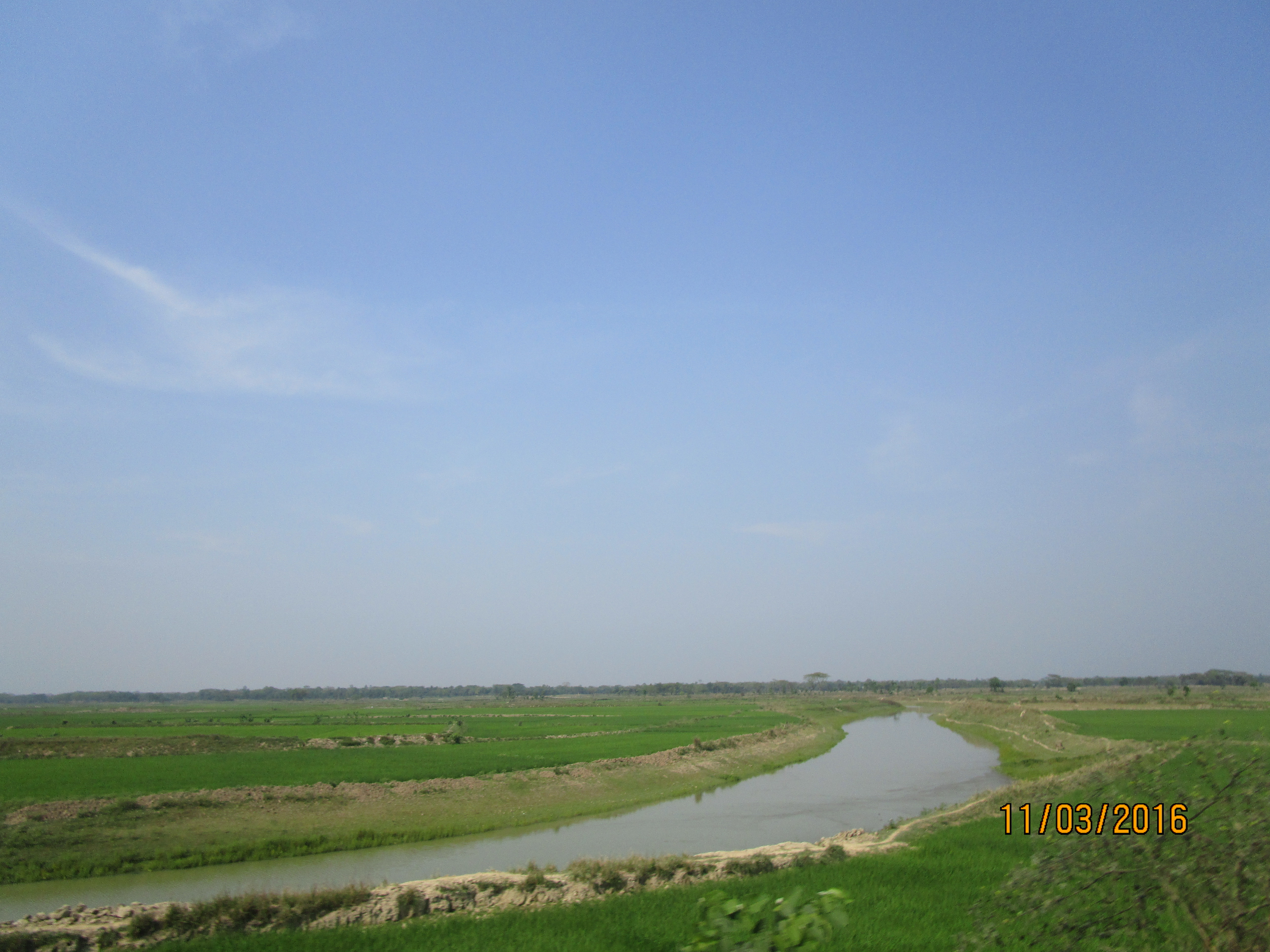
- Khiro River at Trishal

Location
- Country: Bangladesh
- Division: Dhaka
- District: Mymensingh

Physical characteristics
- Source
  - location: Banar River
- Mouth
  - coordinates: 24°29′19″N 90°24′33″E

Khiro River (Bengali: খিরো নদী) is a river in Mymensingh District of north-central Bangladesh.
