= Fuleswari River =

River in Siliguri, West Bengal, India

Coordinates: 26°37′44″N 88°27′10″E

Fuleswari River is a river in Siliguri, West Bengal, India. Its source is in ᤘᤠᤖᤰ ताल of Himalayas in Nepal. In Bangladesh, it is known as Karatoya River.

In December 2024, the West Bengal Irrigation and Waterways department initiated a project with a budget of Rs 10 crore to desilt the Fuleswari and Jorapani Rivers and restore their natural flows. Iron nets attached to 17 bridges along the rivers will be employed to remove man-made waste from the rivers.
