= Gumani River =

River in Bangladesh

Coordinates: 24°10′N 89°28′E

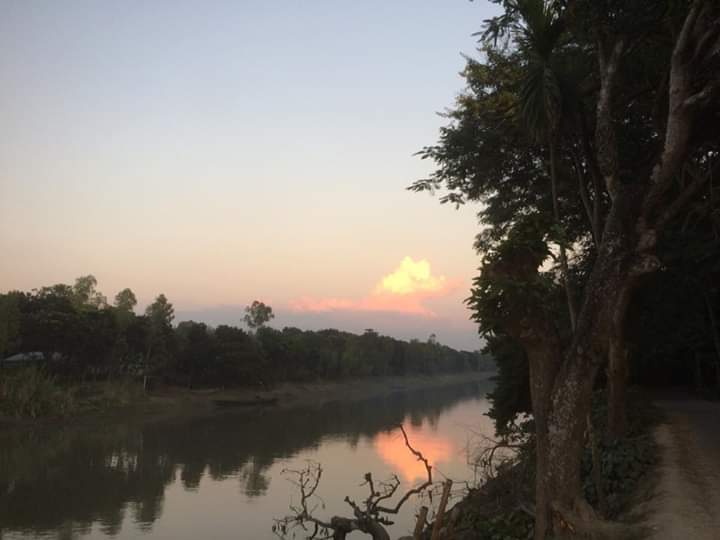

Gumani River is a river in Bangladesh. It originates from the river Padma and meets with the Barani near Morkal Bazar. The joint flow of the Gurnai and Baranai flows southeast as the Gurnai and meets the Gurudaspur near Chanchkoir, Gurudaspur Upazila to the east of the Cholon Bil and flows as the Gumani. Flowing east of Bhangura, the river again meets with the Boral and flows further as the Boral (Atrai-Baral).
