= Arial Khan River =

River in south-west Bangladesh

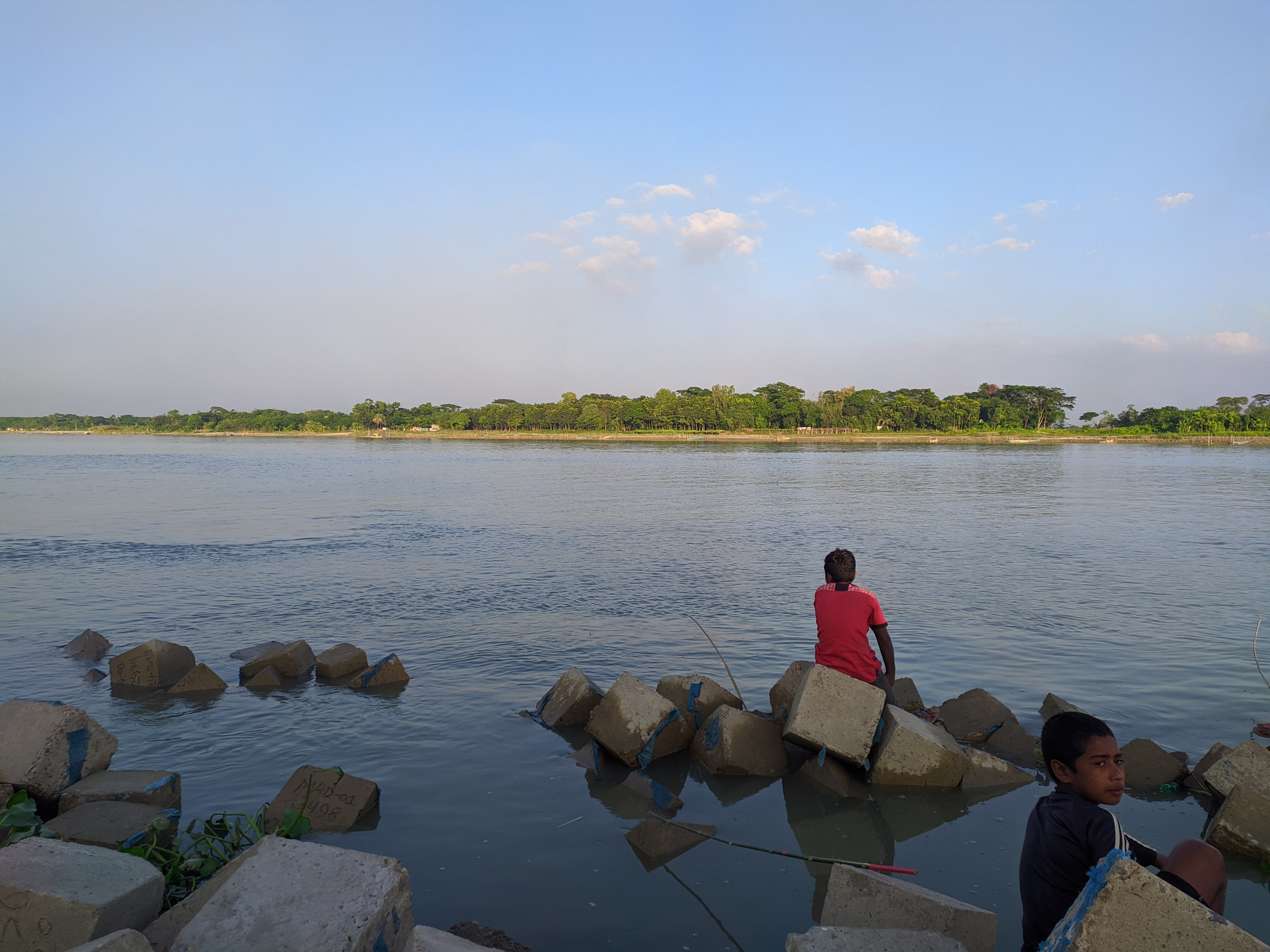
- Fishing scene on the banks of the Arial Khan

Location
- Country: Bangladesh
- Region: Barisal Division
- District: Faridpur District, Madaripur District

Physical characteristics
- Source: Padma river
  - coordinates: 23.4721°N 90.1066°E
- Mouth: Tentulia River
  - coordinates: 22.7596°N 90.4356°E
- Length: 155 km (96 mi)

Ariyal Khan (Bengali: আড়িয়াল খাঁ, romanized: Āṛiẏāl Khā̃, Bengali pronunciation: [aɽijal kʰã]) is a major distributary of the Padma River in the districts of Faridpur, Madaripur, and Barisal. The river is 155 kilometers long, has an average width of 300 meters, and its course is serpentine in nature. The Bangladesh Water Development Board has designated the Ariyal Khan River as River No. 2 in the southwest region.

== History ==
In the past, the river was known as Bhubaneshwar. In 1801, a jamadar named Ariyal Khan was appointed by the government to suppress thuggee activity. Under his direction, a canal was excavated from the river and connected to the southern part of the ancient Padma River. Over time, this canal grew in strength and engulfed parts of the ancient Padma and Bhubaneshwar rivers, eventually becoming widely known among the people as Ariyal Khan.

== Nature of the river's flow ==
At present, among the seaward branches of the Padma, Madhumati and Ariyal Khan are the two main ones. This branch (Ariyal Khan) flows from the Padma, approximately 51.5 kilometers southeast of the Padma at Goalanda Ghat, passing through the districts of Faridpur and Madaripur. It continues through the northeastern parts of Gournadi and Muladi upazilas of Barisal, eventually entering the Tetulia Channel.

Along its path, the Ariyal Khan maintains connectivity with the Padma River through various canals and rivers including Naria Canal, Palong Canal, Bhubaneshwar, Moynakata, Kumar, Kaila, Noyavangni, and Jayanti. The river's course is often winding. It is erosion-prone, and many settlements have been lost to its erosion. The town of Madaripur is also at serious risk of damage from this erosion.

Notable places along the river's banks include Piyajkhali, Chowdhuryhat, Utrail, Dattapara, Kabirajpur, Latikhola, Safipur, Nomorhat, Madaripur Municipality, and Khaserhat Port.

In the late 19th century, Ariyal Khan was the main channel. Currently, its lower course has silted up, and near Madaripur, it splits into two branches. The left-flowing branch retains the name Ariyal Khan, while the right flows under the name Torki.

== Other information ==
The Ariyal Khan River remains navigable throughout the year. In March–April, the water flow is low, but during the monsoon, the flow increases significantly. In July–August, the discharge reaches up to 4,000 cubic meters per second, and the water depth can be up to 12 meters. The total length of the river is 163 kilometers. Up to Madaripur, the regular tidal range is 0.32 meters. The average width is 300 meters. The basin area of the river is 1,438 square kilometers.
