= Baral River =

River in Bangladesh

Coordinates: 24°20′N 89°06′E

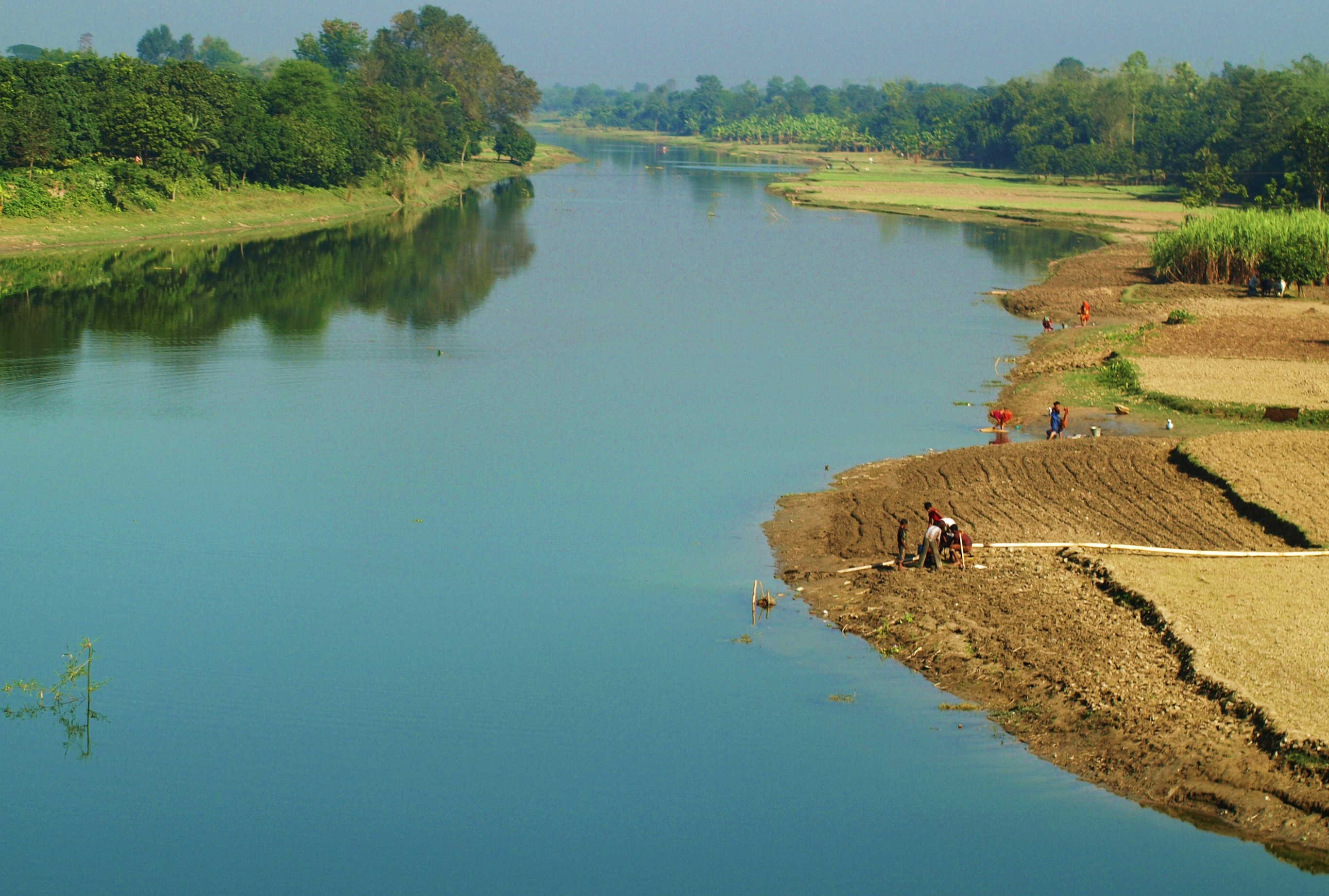

Baral (Borhal Bengali: বড়াল) river, one of the offshoots of the Ganges, starts its journey at Charghat Upazila of Rajshahi District of Bangladesh. Flowing through Natore and Pabna, the Baral meets with the Gumani River east of Bhangura and finally meets with the Hurasagar River after joining with the Karatoya south of Shahjadpur Upazila. The river is approximately 147 kilometres (91 mi) long, and 120 metres (410 ft) wide and 6 metres (20 ft) deep on average. The river receives water from the Ganges only in the monsoon season. But it maintains its flow throughout the year with local runoff water and water from Chalan Beel. Its drainage area is about 230 square kilometres (89 sq mi). Some important places located on the banks of the Baral are: Charghat, Baraigram, Bagatipara, Gurudaspur, Chatmohar, Bhangura and Bera upazilas of Bangladesh. The Baral Bridge is located on this river at Bhangura Upazila.

== Early history ==
The Baral also issues from the Padma at Charghat in the Rajshahi district and receives the water of the Atrai through the channel called the Gumani shortly after it enters the district of Pabna. It flows through the northern part of the Sadar subdivision, passing by the large village of Chatmohar, the headquarters of the Chatmohar subdistrict, and continues its course to south-east.

The Baral meets the Gumani (an extension of the Atrai) near the village of Faridpur in Pabna District (not to be confused with the district headquarters of Faridpur District). The combined waters join the Hurasagar River, south of Shahjadpur Upazila.

Eighteenth-century geographer James Rennell referred to a former course of the Ganges north of its present channel, as follows:

"Appearances favour very strongly that the Ganges had its former bed in the tract now occupied by the lakes and morasses between Natore and Jaffiergunge, striking out of the present course by Bauleah to a junction of Burrrampooter or Megna near Fringybazar, where accumulation of two such mighty streams probably scooped out the present amazing bed of the Megna."

The places mentioned by Rennell proceeding from west to east are Rampur Boali, the headquarters of Rajshahi district, Puthia and Natore in the same district and Jaffarganj in the district of Dhaka. The place last named were shown in a map of the Mymensingh district dated 1861, as a subdistrict (thana) headquarters, about 10 kilometres (6 mi) south-east of Bera Upazila police station. It is now known as Payla Jaffarganj and is close to Elachipur opposite Goalunda. According to Rennell's theory, therefore, the probable former course of the Ganges would correspond with that of the present channel of the Baral River.
