= Old Brahmaputra River =

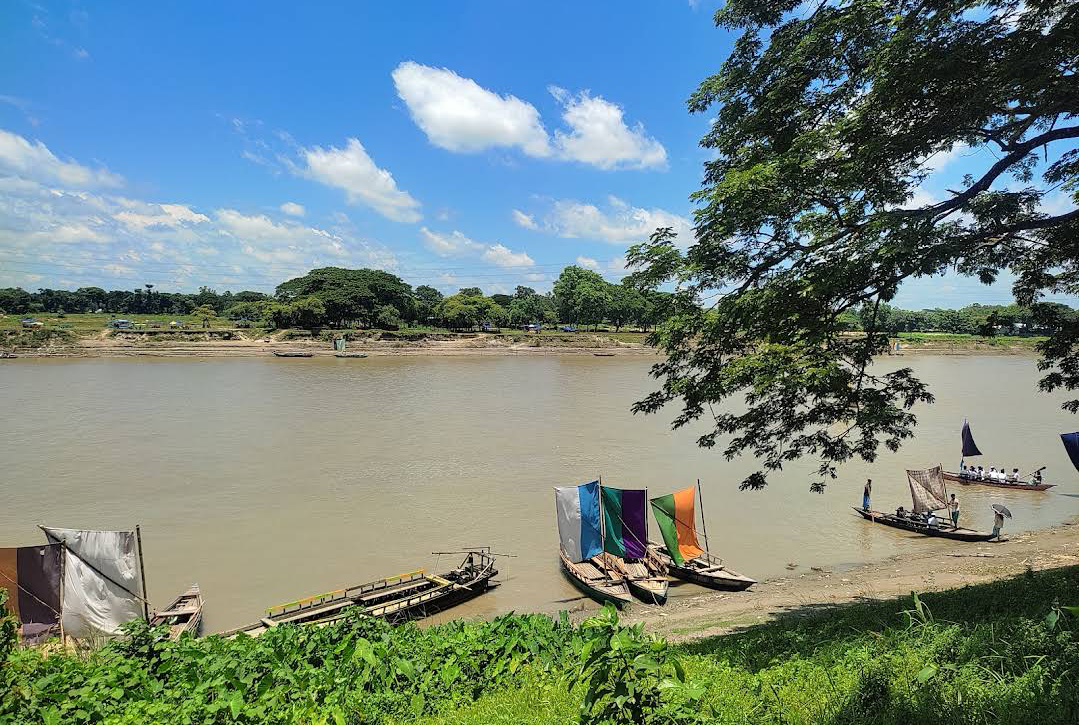

- Location in Bangladesh

Location
- Country: Bangladesh
- Division: Mymensingh Division; Dhaka Division
- District: Jamalpur, Mymensingh, Sherpur, Kishoreganj

Physical characteristics
- Source: Brahmaputra River
- Mouth: Meghna River
  - coordinates: 24°02′00″N 90°59′00″E

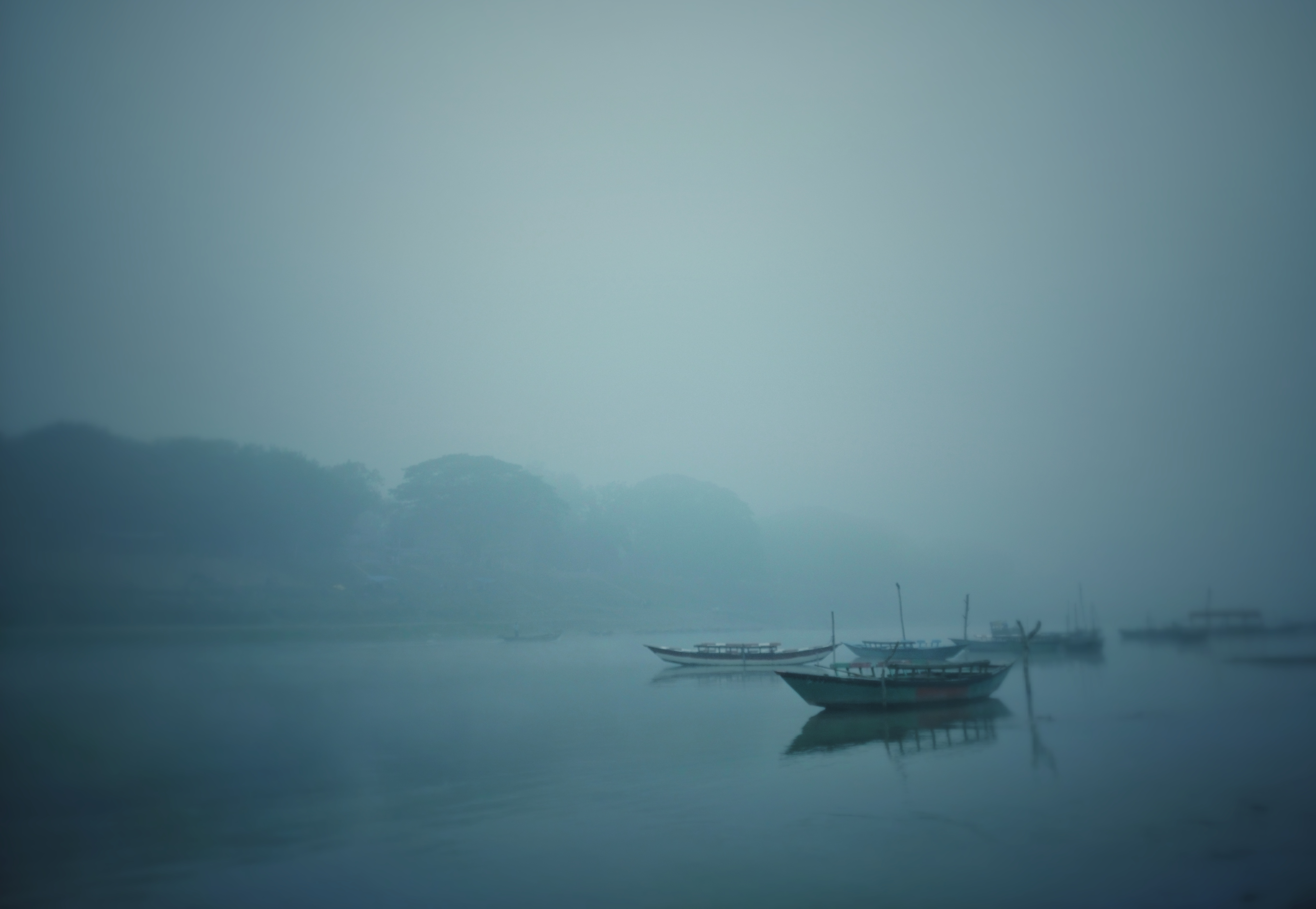
Boats amidst winter fog in Old Brahmaputra, Mymensingh

The Old Brahmaputra River (Bengali: পুরাতন ব্রহ্মপুত্র নদী, romanized: Purātana Brahmaputra Nadī) is a distributary of the Brahmaputra River in north-central Bangladesh. Historically it constituted the main stem of the Brahmaputra, however, the larger river's primary outflow was redirected via the Jamuna River after the 1762 Arakan earthquake. Today, the Old Brahmaputra has been relegated to a minor river with much less flow than its former self. The river branches off from the Brahmaputra in Jamalpur District and Mymensingh then flows southeasterly for approximately 200 km (120 mi) before meeting the Meghna River in Kishoreganj District.
