= Karatoya River =

Coordinates: 24°13′N 89°36′E

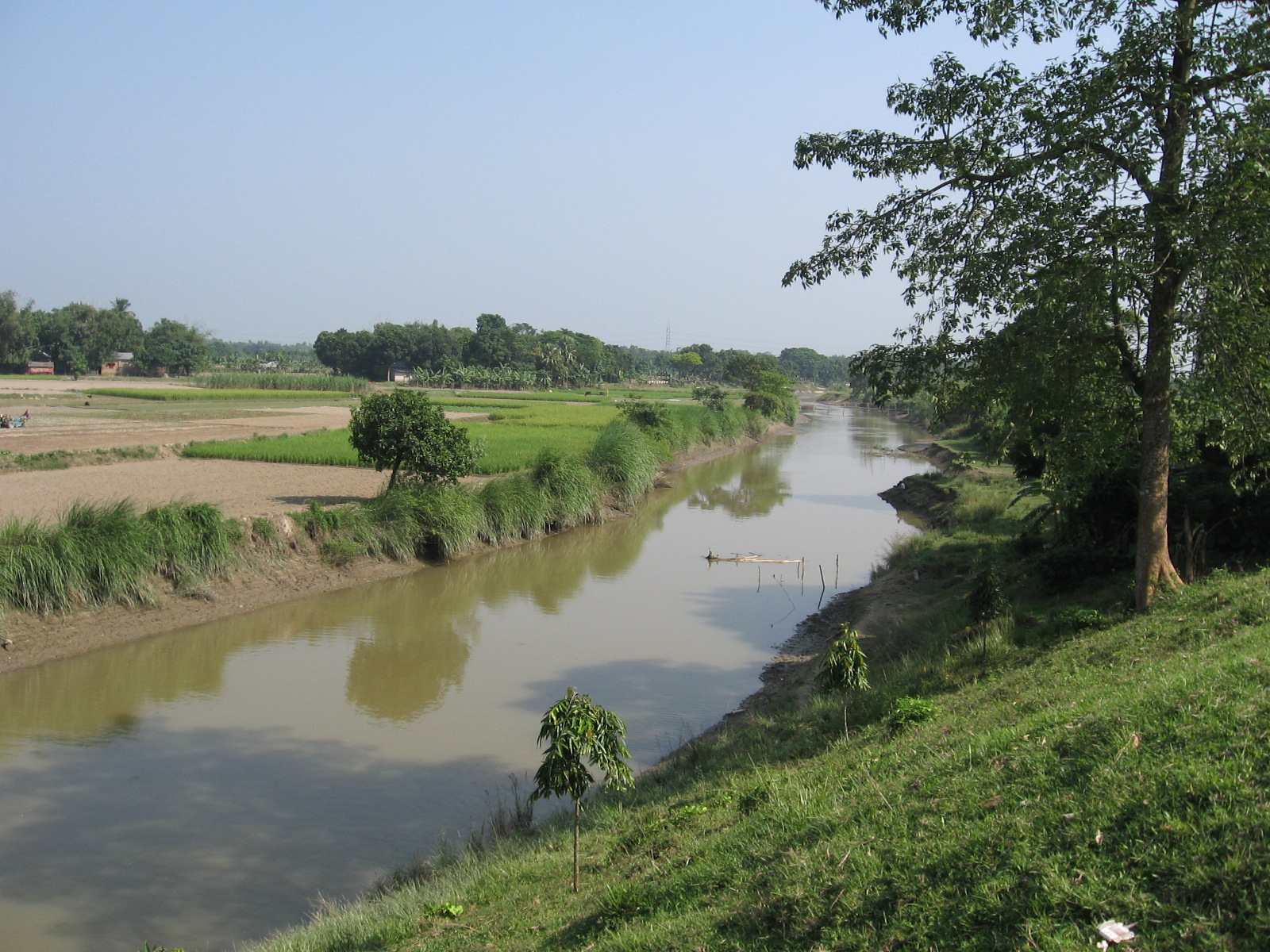
- Karatoya River near Mahasthangarh

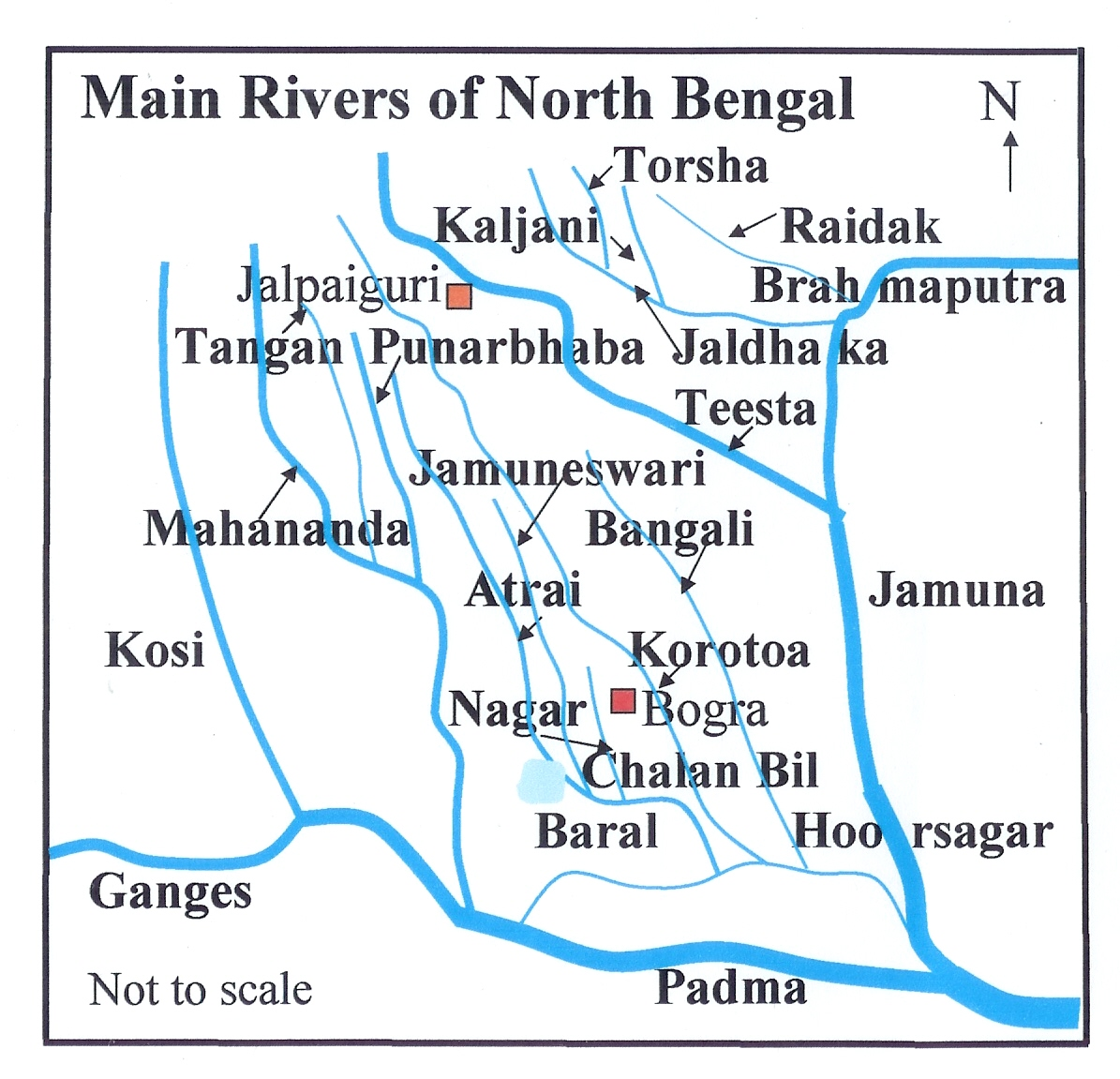

Location
- Countries: Bangladesh
- Division: Rajshahi
- District: Bogura

Basin features
- Tributaries
  - right: Fuleswari river

Karatoya River (also spelt Korotoa River) is a small stream in Rajshahi Division of Bangladesh.

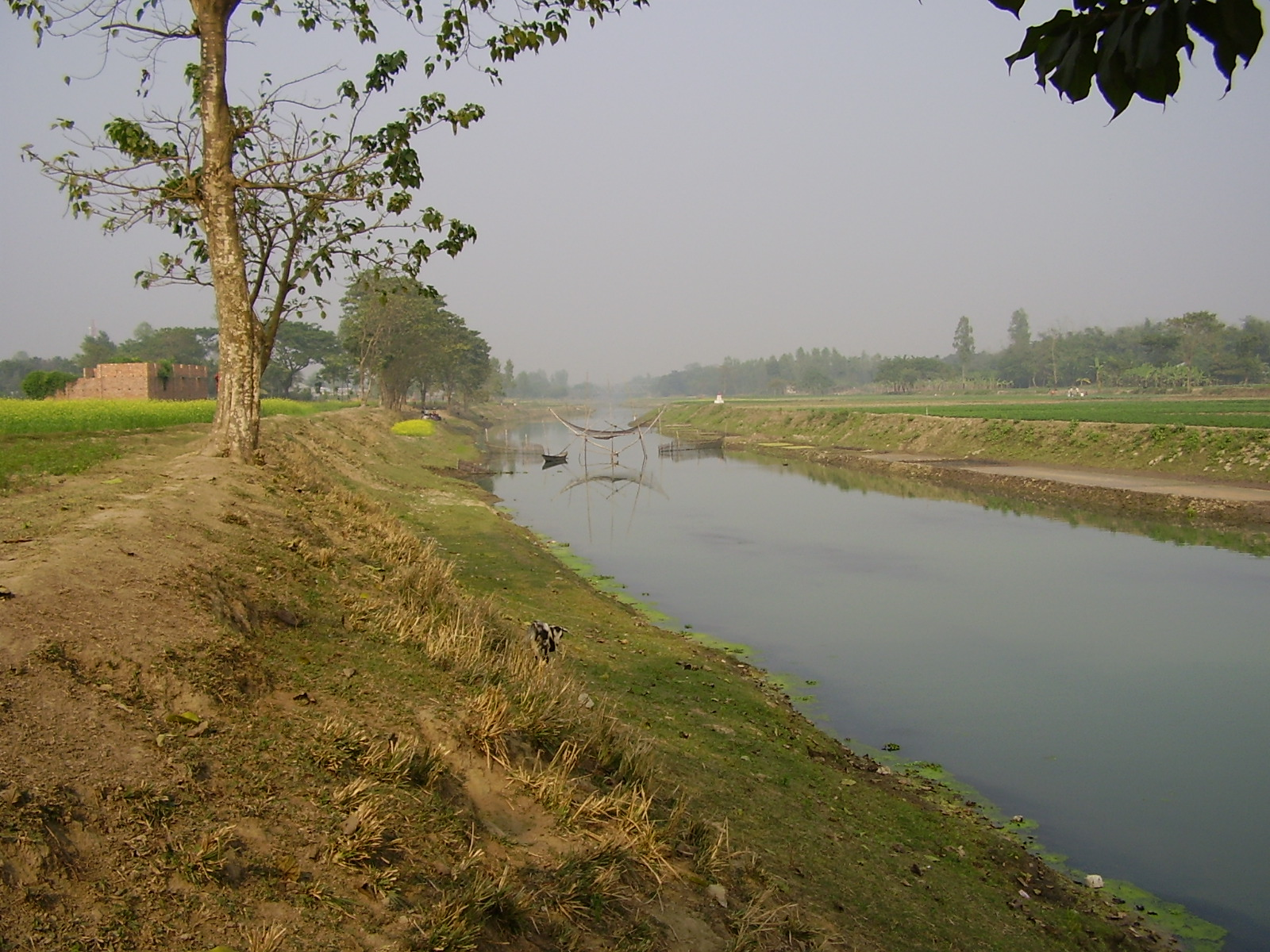
Karatoya River, winter 2007, Bogra

== Etymology ==
The name of the river is a combination of two Vedic Sanskrit words: क॒र (kará) meaning "hand" (as an instrument of action) and तोय॑ (tóya) meaning "water".

== Course ==
The Karatoya, known as the Phuleshwari which sources in the ᤘᤠᤖᤰ (Vārak) tāl ("lake" in Nepali) of Himalayas in Nepal, rises in the Baikunthapur forests in the extreme north-west of Jalpaiguri district (West Bengal, India) and forms for some distance the boundary between Dinajpur and Rangpur districts in Bangladesh. It then meanders through Rangpur and Bogura. In the south of Bogura district, it receives the Halhalia and the united stream is then known as the Phuljhur. It leaves Bogura at the Chanda kona and flowing in a southerly direction past Raiganj and Shujapur is joined by the Ichhamati at Nalka. The Phuljhur then flows south past the important village of Ullapara, a few miles below which it joins the Hurasagar at Narnia after a course of about 64 kilometres (40 mi) in this district. After this junction, it takes the name of the Hurasagar and passing close by Shazadpur and Hera joins the Jamuna near Bera.

=== Course changes ===
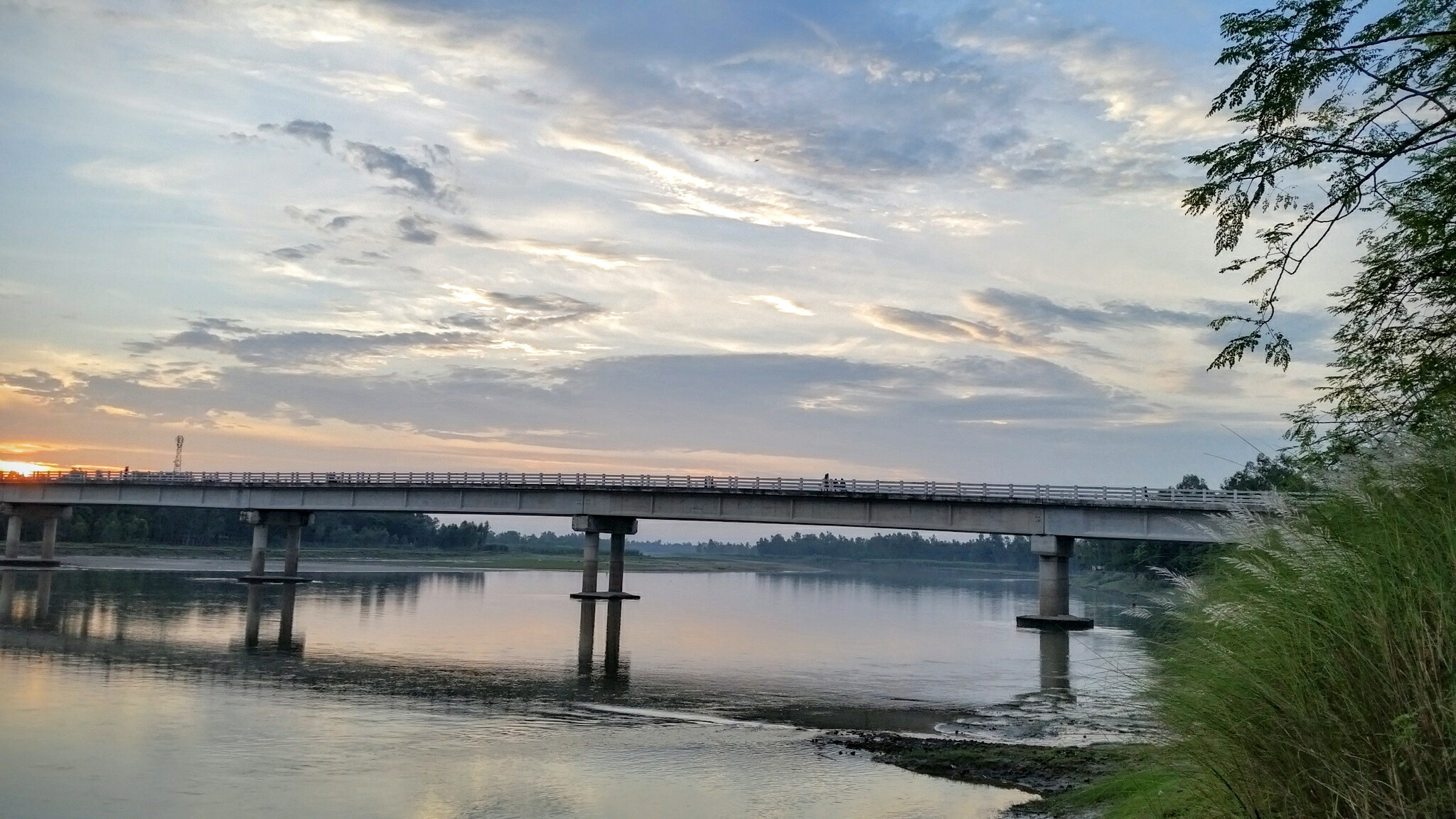
Dr. M A Wazed Miah bridge over Karatoya river in Kanchdaha, Rangpur.

The Karatoya is one of the rivers that has changed over the years. Previous rivers that the Karatoya connected to included the Teesta and Kosi.

The map (right) shows the main rivers in North Bengal and adjoining areas. Not shown are numerous tributaries and distributaries, which connect the main rivers, and allow the main rivers to change course. Therefore, the river-system pattern undergoes continuous changes. Such changes have not been reflected in the map. Moreover, many of the rivers have local names for sections of the course, adding to the complexity of the river system.

The Karatoya is made up of four parts and connects adjoining rivers.

== History ==
The Karatoya is mentioned in the Puranas and had a high repute for sanctity. Also known as Sadānīrā ('always fulls of water in Sanskrit), the river marked the easternmost boundary of Aryavarta. It was the eastern boundary of the old kingdom of Pundravardhana, the country of the Paundras. In the classical period, it formed the western boundary of Kamarupa, and later the Kamata kingdom. It is shown in Van Den Brouk's map of Bengal (C, 1660) as flowing into the Ganges and in fact. before the destructive floods of 1787 it brought down to the Atrai and to the Ganges a great volume of Teesta water. Since the main stream of the Teesta was diverted to the east in 1787, the Karatoya and the Phuljhur have gradually silted up. and they are at the present day rivers of minor importance. One channel, which joins the Baral, 48 kilometres (30 mi) east of Pabna. is still called indifferently the Buri Teesta or old Teesta and the Karto or Karatoya. Traces of an old channel, for which the name of the Karatoya is claimed, are also pointed out in the Chatmohar thana, where it appears to have been obliterated by the Baral.

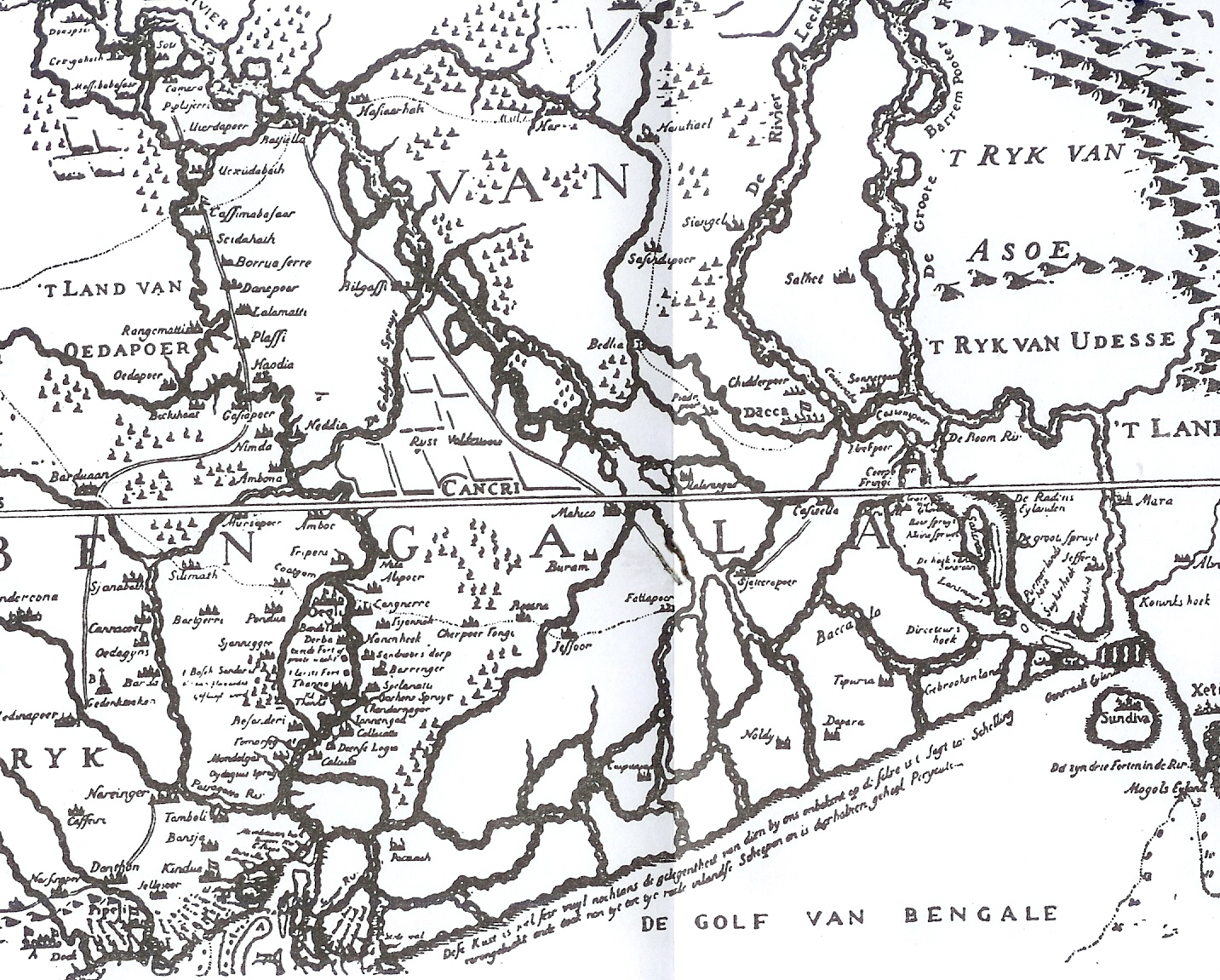
Van den Brouck's map

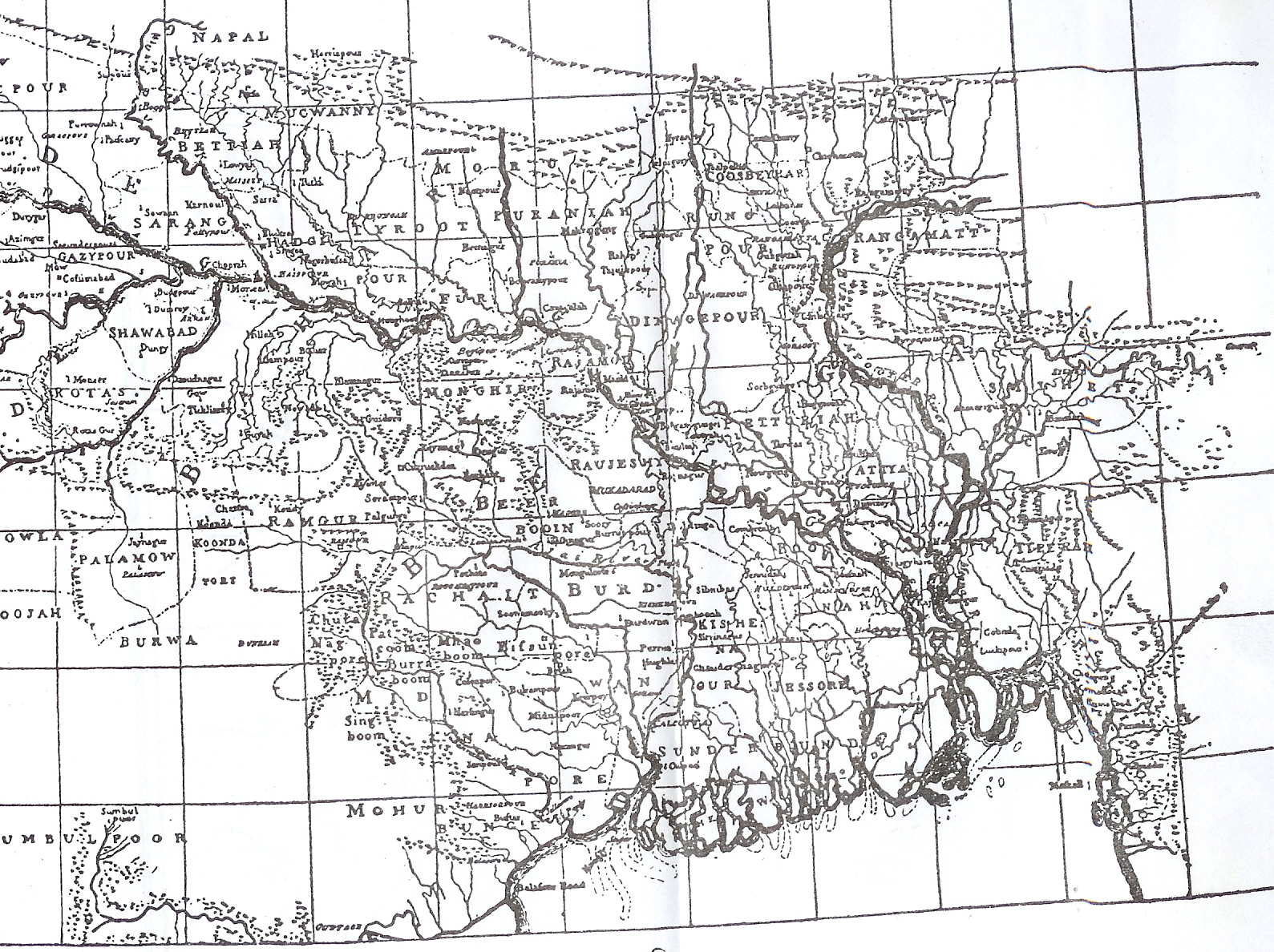
Rennel's map

During the early 1100s, the Ganges was three times smaller than the Karatoya according to the Siyar-al-Mutakhkhirin. By the late 1600s, the river had become a channel according to a map by Ven den Brouck. During the late 1700s, James Rennell created additional maps.
