= Jamuna River (Bangladesh) =

River in Bangladesh

Coordinates: 23°49′N 89°45′E

Jamuna
- Jamuna river

Location
- Country: Bangladesh
- Division: Rangpur Division; Rajshahi division; Mymensingh division; Dhaka division
- District: Kurigram; Gaibandha; Jamalpur; Bogra; Sirajganj; Tangail; Pabna; Manikganj

Physical characteristics
- Source: Brahmaputra
- Mouth: Padma
- Length: 205 km (127 mi)

Basin features
- Bridges: Jamuna Bridge; Jamuna Railway Bridge

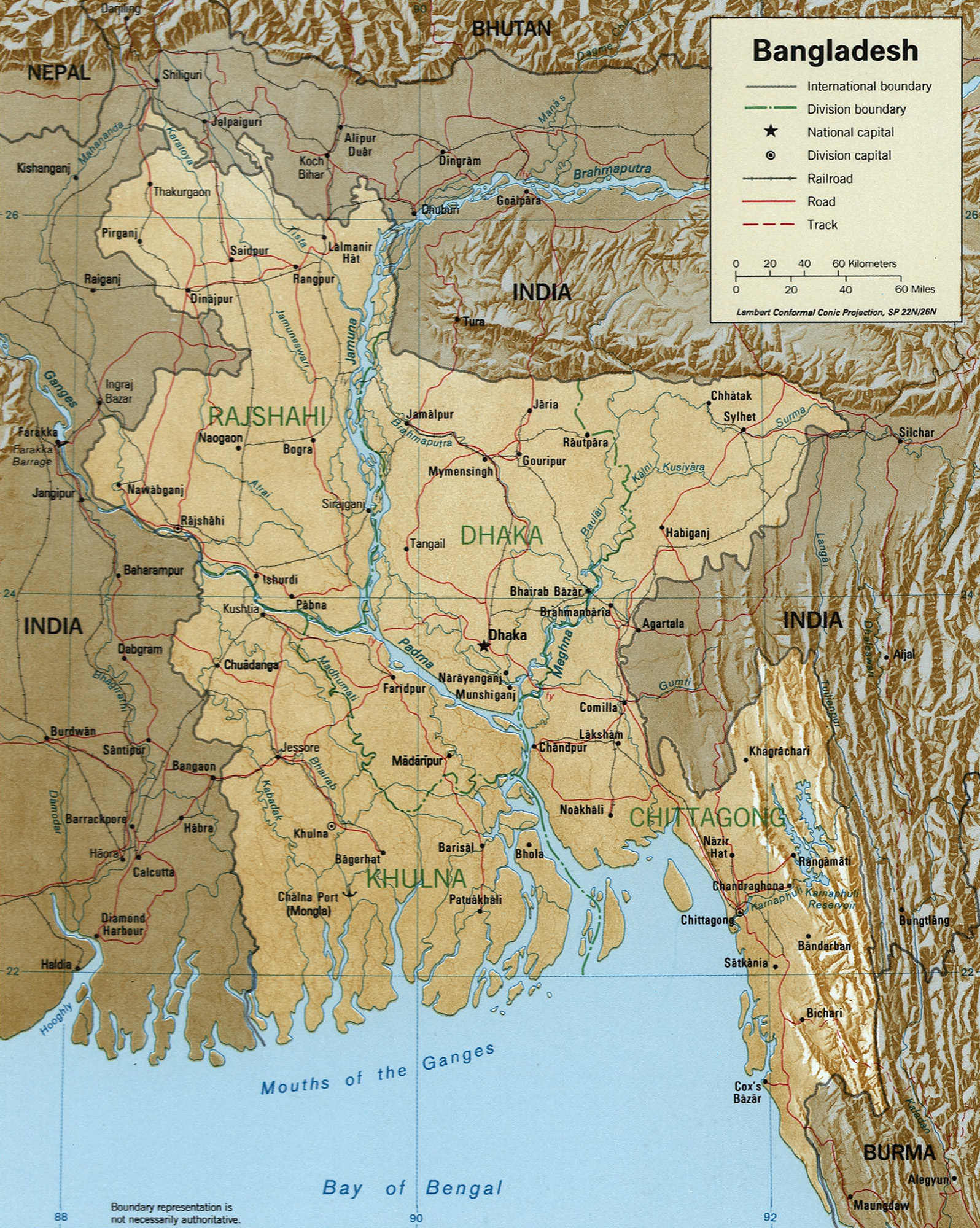
A map showing major rivers in Bangladesh including Jamuna.

The Jamuna River (Bengali: যমুনা) is one of the three main rivers of Bangladesh. The two other major rivers in Bangladesh are the Padma and the Meghna. The Jamuna is the lower stream of the Brahmaputra River, which originates in Tibet as Yarlung Tsangpo, before flowing through India and then southwest into Bangladesh. The Jamuna flows south and joins the Padma River, near Goalundo Ghat.

The Brahmaputra-Jamuna is a classic example of a braided river and is highly susceptible to channel migration and avulsion. It is characterised by a network of interlacing channels with numerous sandbars enclosed between them. The sandbars, known in Bengali as chars, do not occupy a permanent position. The river deposits them in one year, very often to be destroyed later, and redeposits them in the next rainy season. The process of bank and deposit erosion together with redeposition has been going on continuously, making it difficult to precisely demarcate the boundary between the districts of Sirajganj and Pabna on one side and the districts of Mymensingh, Tangail and Dhaka on the other. The breaking of a char or the emergence of a new one is also a cause of much violence and litigation. The confluence of the Jamuna and the Padma rivers is unusually unstable and has been shown to have migrated southeast by over fourteen kilometres between 1972 and 2014.

== Course ==
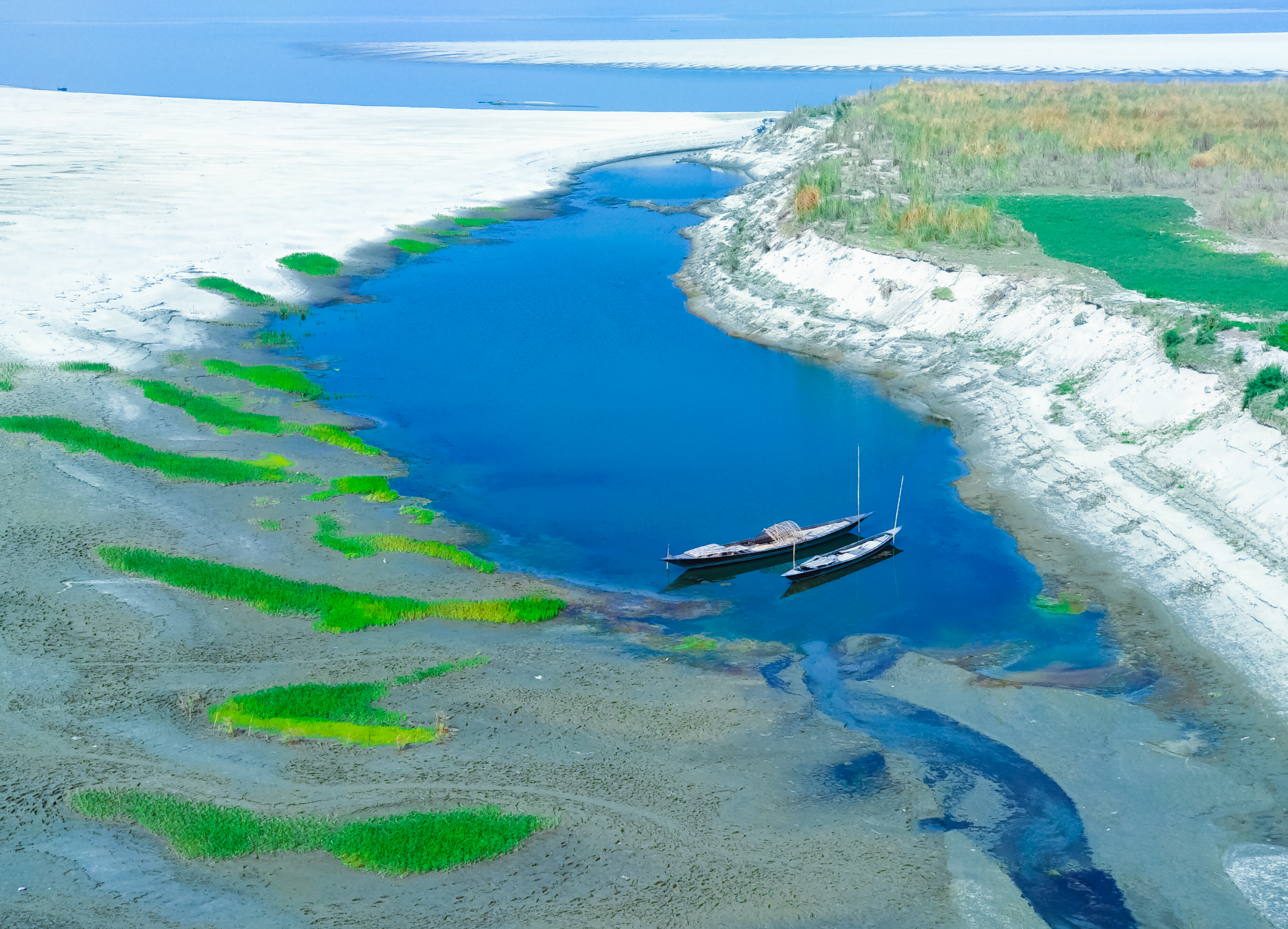
A view of Jamuna River from Jamuna Bridge

In Bangladesh, the Brahmaputra is joined by the Teesta River (or Tista), which is one of its largest tributaries.

James Rennell made a survey between 1764 and 1777 and his maps are one of the earliest authentic maps of Bengal in existence. In these maps, Teesta is shown as flowing through North Bengal in several branches — Punarbhaba, Atrai, Karatoya, etc. All these streams combined lower down with the Mahananda river, now the westernmost river in North Bengal, and taking the name of Hoorsagar finally discharged into the Ganges at Jafarganj, near modern Goalundo. The Hoorsagar river is still in existence, being the combined outfall of the Baral, a spill channel of the Ganges, the Atrai, the Jamuna or Jamuneswari (not the main Jamuna through which the Brahmaputra now flows), and the Karatoya, but instead of falling into the Ganges, it falls into the main Jamuna, a few kilometres above its confluence with the Padma at Goalundo.

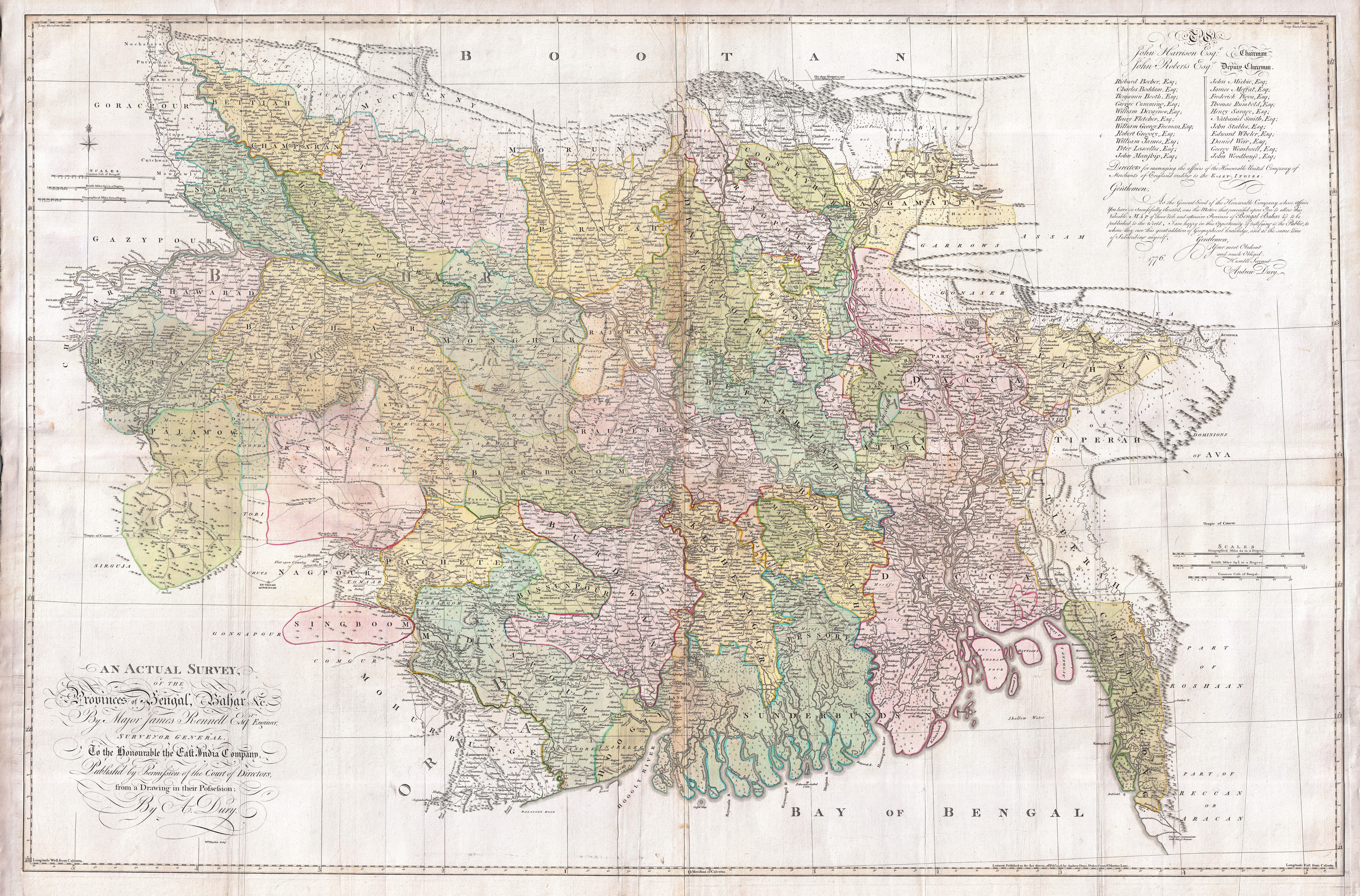
James Rennell's 1776 map shows the Brahmaputra's main flow through Jamalpur and Mymensingh and a much narrower Jamuna or Jamuneswari before an earthquake in 1762, and the Teesta R. flowing in 3 channels to the Ganges before a flood in 1787.

Below the Teesta, the Brahmaputra splits into two distributary branches. The western branch, which contains the majority of the river's flow, continues due south as the Jamuna to merge with the lower Ganges, called the Padma River. The eastern branch, formerly the larger but now much smaller, is called the lower or Old Brahmaputra. It curves southeast to join the Meghna River near Dhaka. The Padma and Meghna converge near Chandpur and flow out into the Bay of Bengal. This final part of the river is called Meghna.

In the past the course of the lower Brahmaputra was different and passed through the Jamalpur and Mymensingh districts. The river flowed east of Dhaka and the old course is now called Old Brahmaputra River. The huge earthquake on 2 April 1762 of estimated magnitude 8 on the moment magnitude scale caused tectonic uplift of the Madhupur tract. The main channel of the Brahmaputra at Bhahadurabad point was switched southwards and opened as Jamuna due to the result of caused tectonic uplift of the Madhupur tract. The earthquake caused both uplift and subsidence that resulted in change in course of the Brahmaputra River to from east of Dhaka (Old Brahmaputra River) to 150 kilometres (93 mi) to the west via the Jamuna River. The old course can be seen on https://ars.els-cdn.com/content/image/1-s2.0-S0169555X21001045-ga1_lrg.jpg.

The Jamuna is a very wide river. During the rainy season it stretches about 8–13 km (5–8 mi) from bank to bank. Even during the dry season when the waters subside, the breadth is seldom less than 3–5 km (2–3 mi).

The Jamuna was a barrier in establishing a direct road link between the capital Dhaka and northern part of Bangladesh, better known as Rajshahi Division, until 1996. This was mitigated by the completion of the Jamuna Multi-purpose Bridge. The Jamuna is also a very important waterway. It is navigable all year round by large cargo and passenger steamers. Before the Partition of Bengal in 1947, passenger steamers used to ply up to Dibrugarh in the state of Assam in the Indian Union. At present two steamer ferry services link the district of Pabna with the districts of Mymensingh, Tangail and Dhaka. The Bangladesh Railway maintains a ferry service between Sirajganj and Jagannathganj in Mymensingh. The other ferry service between Nagarbari in Pabna and Aricha in Dhaka is run by the C & B Department.

== Gallery ==
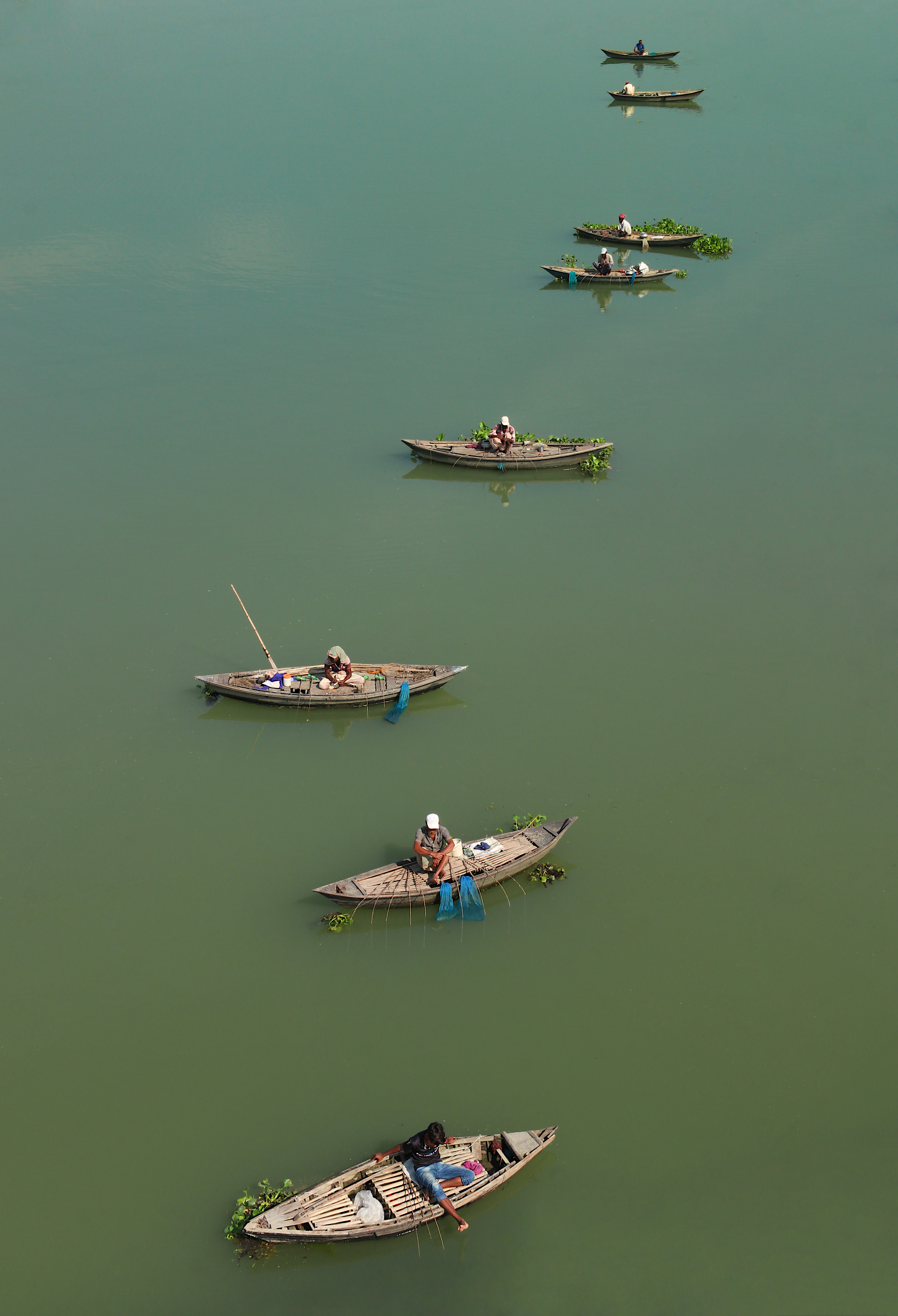
Fishing boats on the Jamuna River

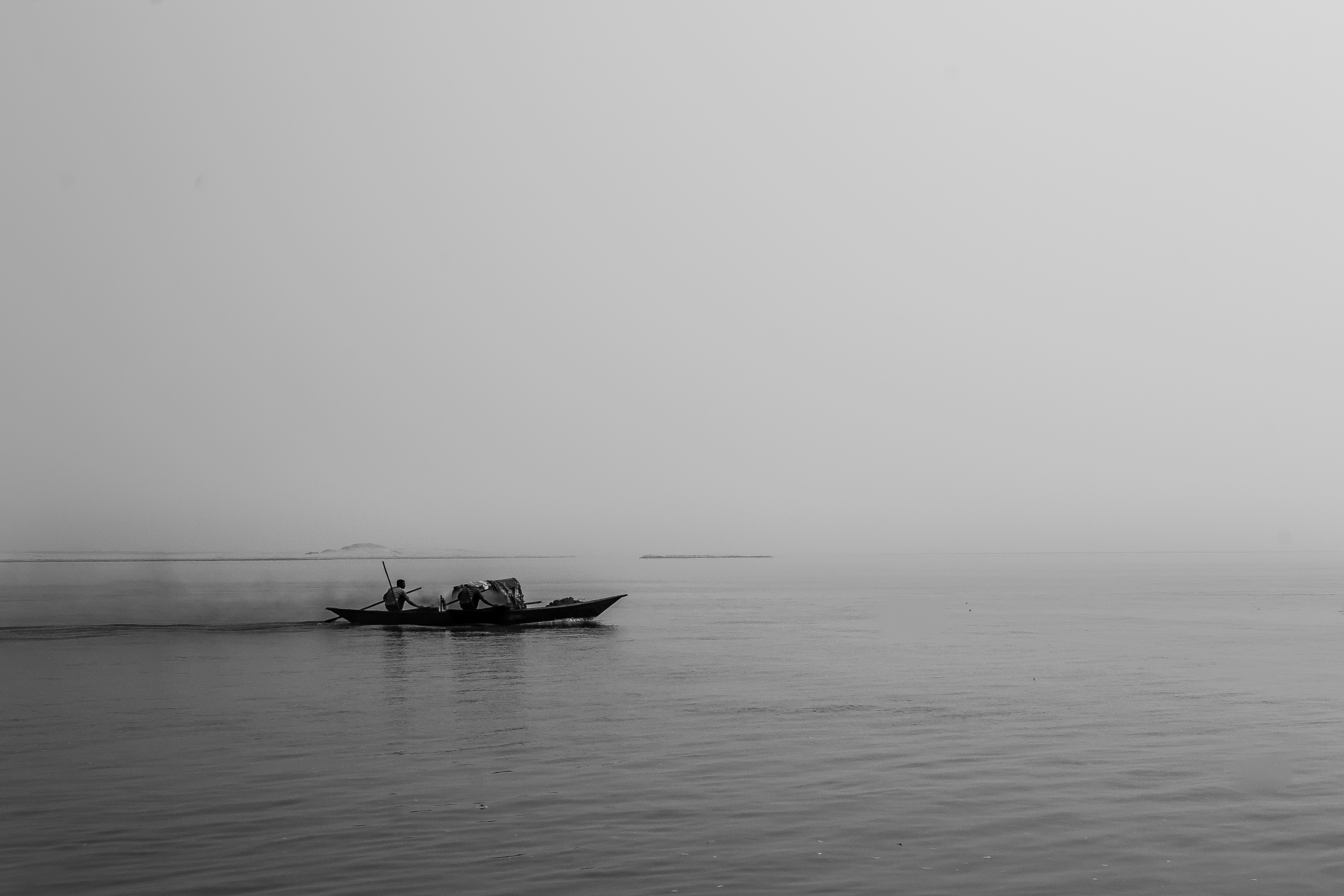
Jamuna River

== See also ==
- List of rivers in Bangladesh
