= List of rivers of Guadeloupe =

This is a list of rivers of Guadeloupe. Rivers are listed in clockwise order, starting at the Rivière Salèe which divides Basse-Terre from Grand-Terre.

== Basse-Terre ==
- Rivière Salée (Ocean channel)
- Lézarde
- Rivière Moustique
- Rose Rivière
- La Petite Rivière à Goyaves
- Rivière de Sainte-Marie
- Grande Rivière de la Capesterre
- Rivière du Grand Carbet
- Rivière du Petit Carbet
- Rivière de Bananier
- Rivière Bourceau
- Rivière Saint-Sauveur
- Rivière Grande Anse
- Rivière du Trou au Chien
- Le Galion Rivière
- Rivière aux Herbes
- Rivière des Pères
- Rivière du Pérou
- Rivière du Plessis
- Grande Rivière des Vieux-Habitants
- Rivière de Beaugendre
- Rivière Grande Plaine
- Rivière Petite Plaine
- Rivière Madame
- Rivière Moustique (Rivière Moustique à Sainte-Rose)
- Grande Rivière à Goyaves
  - Rivière Bras David
  - Rivière Corossol
- Rivière du Lamentin
- River Sens

== Grande-Terre ==
- Rivière Salée (Ocean channel)
- Canal Perrin
- Canal des Rotours
  - Rivière des Coudes (Ravine Coudes)

== Marie-Galante ==
- Rivière de Saint-Louis à Marie-Galante
- Rivière du Vieux-Fort
