= Geography of Guadeloupe =

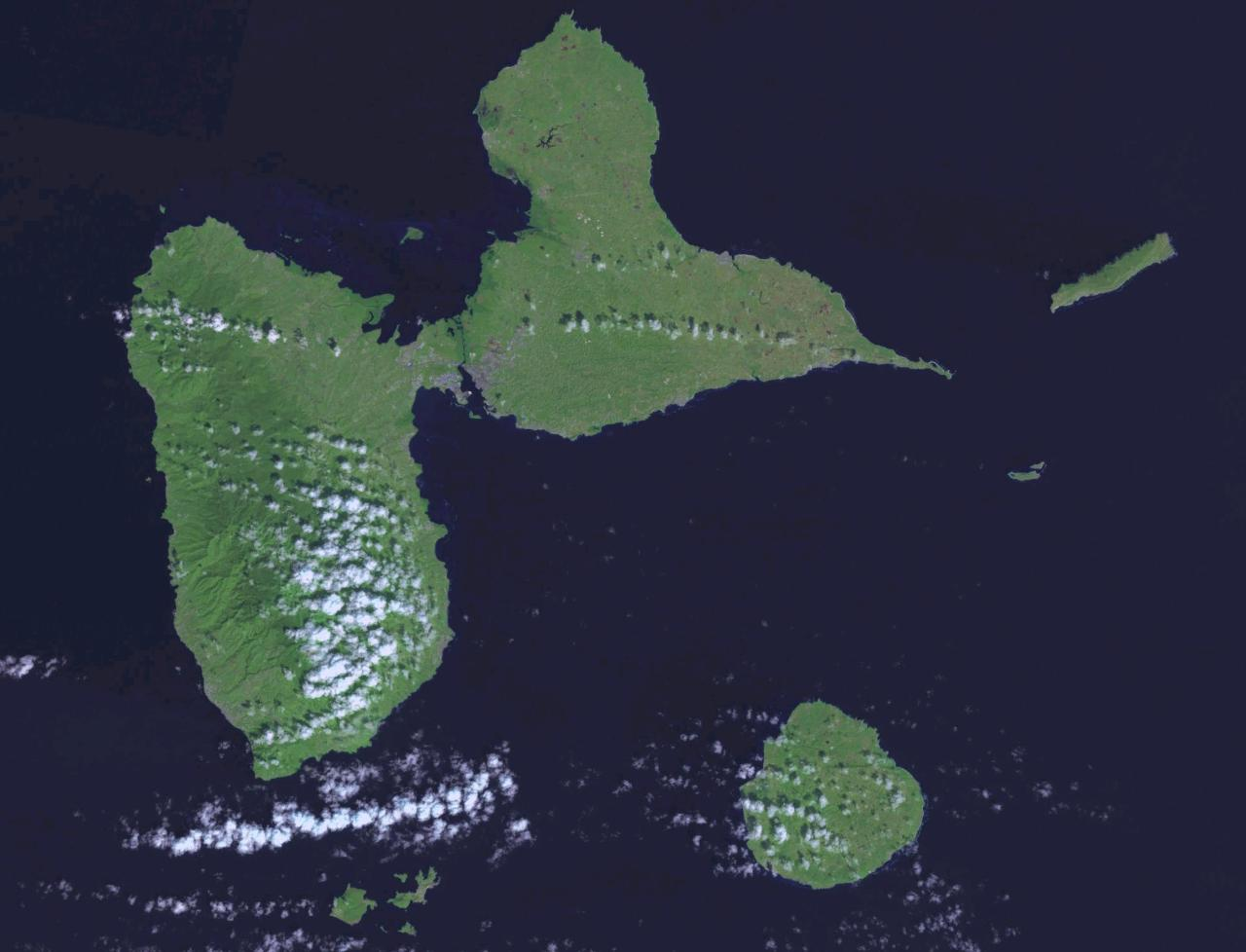
Satellite photo of Guadeloupe

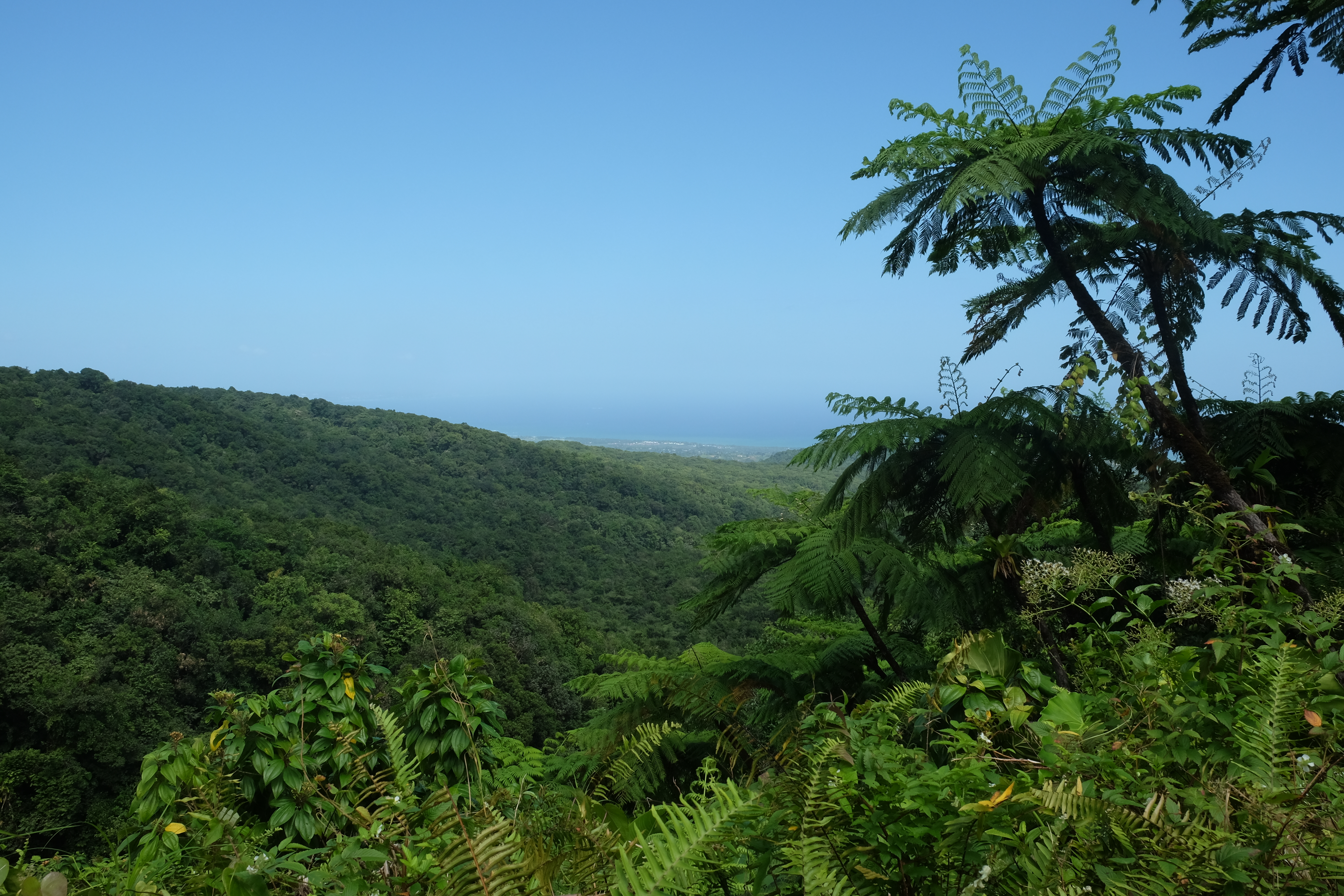
Lush forest on Basse-Terre

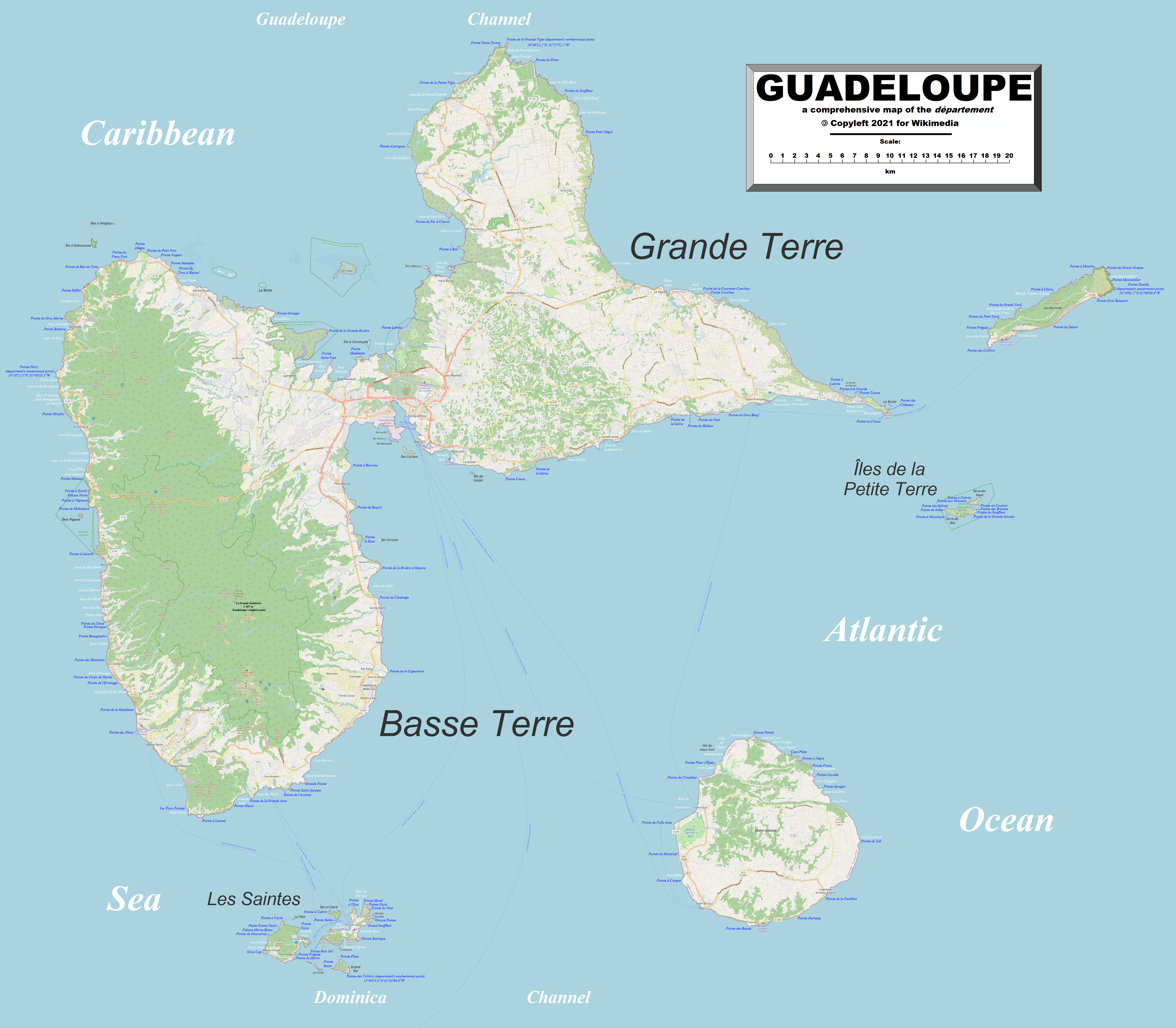
Detailed map of Guadeloupe

Guadeloupe is an archipelago of more than 12 islands, as well as islets and rocks situated where the northeastern Caribbean Sea meets the western Atlantic Ocean. It is located in the Leeward Islands in the northern part of the Lesser Antilles, a partly volcanic island arc. To the north lie Antigua and Barbuda and the British Overseas Territory of Montserrat, with Dominica lying to the south.

The two main islands are Basse-Terre (west) and Grande-Terre (east), which form a butterfly shape as viewed from above, the two 'wings' of which are separated by the Grand Cul-de-Sac Marin, Rivière Salée and Petit Cul-de-Sac Marin. More than half of Guadeloupe's land surface consists of the 847.8 km^{2} Basse-Terre. The island is mountainous, containing such peaks as Mount Sans Toucher (4,442 feet; 1,354 metres) and Grande Découverte (4,143 feet; 1,263 metres), culminating in the active volcano La Grande Soufrière, the highest mountain peak in the Lesser Antilles with an elevation of 1,467 metres (4,813 ft). In contrast Grande-Terre is mostly flat, with rocky coasts to the north, irregular hills at the centre, mangrove at the southwest, and white sand beaches sheltered by coral reefs along the southern shore. This is where the main tourist resorts are found.

Marie-Galante is the third-largest island, followed by La Désirade, a north-east slanted limestone plateau, the highest point of which is 275 metres (902 ft). To the south lies the Îles de Petite-Terre, which are two islands (Terre de Haut and Terre de Bas) totalling 2 km^{2}.

Les Saintes is an archipelago of eight islands of which two, Terre-de-Bas and Terre-de-Haut are inhabited. The landscape is similar to that of Basse-Terre, with volcanic hills and irregular shoreline with deep bays.

There are numerous other smaller islands, most notably Tête à l'Anglais, Îlet à Kahouanne, Îlet à Fajou, Îlet Macou, Îlet aux Foux, Îlets de Carénage, La Biche, Îlet Crabière, Îlets à Goyaves, Îlet à Cochons, Îlet à Boissard, Îlet à Chasse and Îlet du Gosier.

== Geology ==
The two halves of Guadeloupe are geologically distinct. The western half is part of an active volcanic arc that extends from Saba to Grenada. The eastern half is part of an older extinct volcanic arc that includes Anguila, Saint Martin, Saint Barts, Barbuda, Antigua, Grand Terre and Marie Galante. Here the mountains are worn down and the soil is mostly coral limestone. Because of the porous soil and lack of mountains to catch rainfall, agriculture is limited by insufficient water.

Basse-Terre is a volcanic island. The Lesser Antilles are at the outer edge of the Caribbean Plate, and Guadeloupe is part of the outer arc of the Lesser Antilles Volcanic Arc. Many of the islands were formed as a result of the subduction of oceanic crust of the Atlantic Plate under the Caribbean Plate in the Lesser Antilles subduction zone. This process is ongoing and is responsible for volcanic and earthquake activity in the region. Guadeloupe was formed from multiple volcanoes, of which only La Grande Soufrière is not extinct. Its last eruption was in 1976, and led to the evacuation of the southern part of Basse-Terre. 73,600 people were displaced throughout three and a half months following the eruption.

K–Ar dating indicates that the three northern massifs on Basse-Terre Island are 2.79 million years old. Sections of volcanoes collapsed and eroded within the last 650,000 years, after which the Sans Toucher volcano grew in the collapsed area. Volcanoes in the north of Basse-Terre Island mainly produced andesite and basaltic andesite. There are several beaches of dark or "black" sand.

La Désirade, east of the main islands, has a basement from the Mesozoic, overlaid with thick limestones from the Pliocene to Quaternary periods.

Grande-Terre and Marie-Galante have basements probably composed of volcanic units of Eocene to Oligocene, but there are no visible outcrops. On Grande-Terre, the overlying carbonate platform is 120 metres thick.

Acomat Falls is a waterfall nine meter tall.

== Climate ==
The islands are part of the Leeward Islands, so called because they are downwind of the prevailing trade winds, which blow out of the northeast. This was significant in the days of sailing ships. Grande-Terre is so named because it is on the eastern, or windward side, exposed to the Atlantic winds. Basse-Terre is so named because it is on the leeward south-west side and sheltered from the winds. Guadeloupe has a tropical climate tempered by maritime influences and the Trade Winds. There are two seasons, the dry season called "Lent" from January to June, and the wet season called "winter", from July to December.

Climate data for Guadeloupe
Month	Jan	Feb	Mar	Apr	May	Jun	Jul	Aug	Sep	Oct	Nov	Dec	Year
Mean daily maximum °C (°F)	29.1 (84.4)	29.1 (84.4)	29.4 (84.9)	30.1 (86.2)	30.7 (87.3)	31.3 (88.3)	31.5 (88.7)	31.6 (88.9)	31.5 (88.7)	31.2 (88.2)	30.5 (86.9)	29.6 (85.3)	30.5 (86.9)
Daily mean °C (°F)	24.5 (76.1)	24.5 (76.1)	24.9 (76.8)	25.9 (78.6)	26.9 (80.4)	27.5 (81.5)	27.6 (81.7)	27.7 (81.9)	27.4 (81.3)	27.0 (80.6)	26.3 (79.3)	25.2 (77.4)	26.3 (79.3)
Mean daily minimum °C (°F)	19.9 (67.8)	19.9 (67.8)	20.4 (68.7)	21.7 (71.1)	23.1 (73.6)	23.8 (74.8)	23.8 (74.8)	23.7 (74.7)	23.3 (73.9)	22.9 (73.2)	22.1 (71.8)	20.9 (69.6)	22.1 (71.8)
Average precipitation mm (inches)	84 (3.3)	64 (2.5)	73 (2.9)	123 (4.8)	148 (5.8)	118 (4.6)	150 (5.9)	198 (7.8)	236 (9.3)	228 (9.0)	220 (8.7)	137 (5.4)	1,779 (70.0)
Average precipitation days	15.0	11.5	11.5	11.6	13.6	12.8	15.4	16.2	16.6	18.1	16.6	15.7	174.6
Mean monthly sunshine hours	235.6	229.1	232.5	240.0	244.9	237.0	244.9	248.0	216.0	217.0	207.0	223.2	2,775.2
Source: Hong Kong Observatory

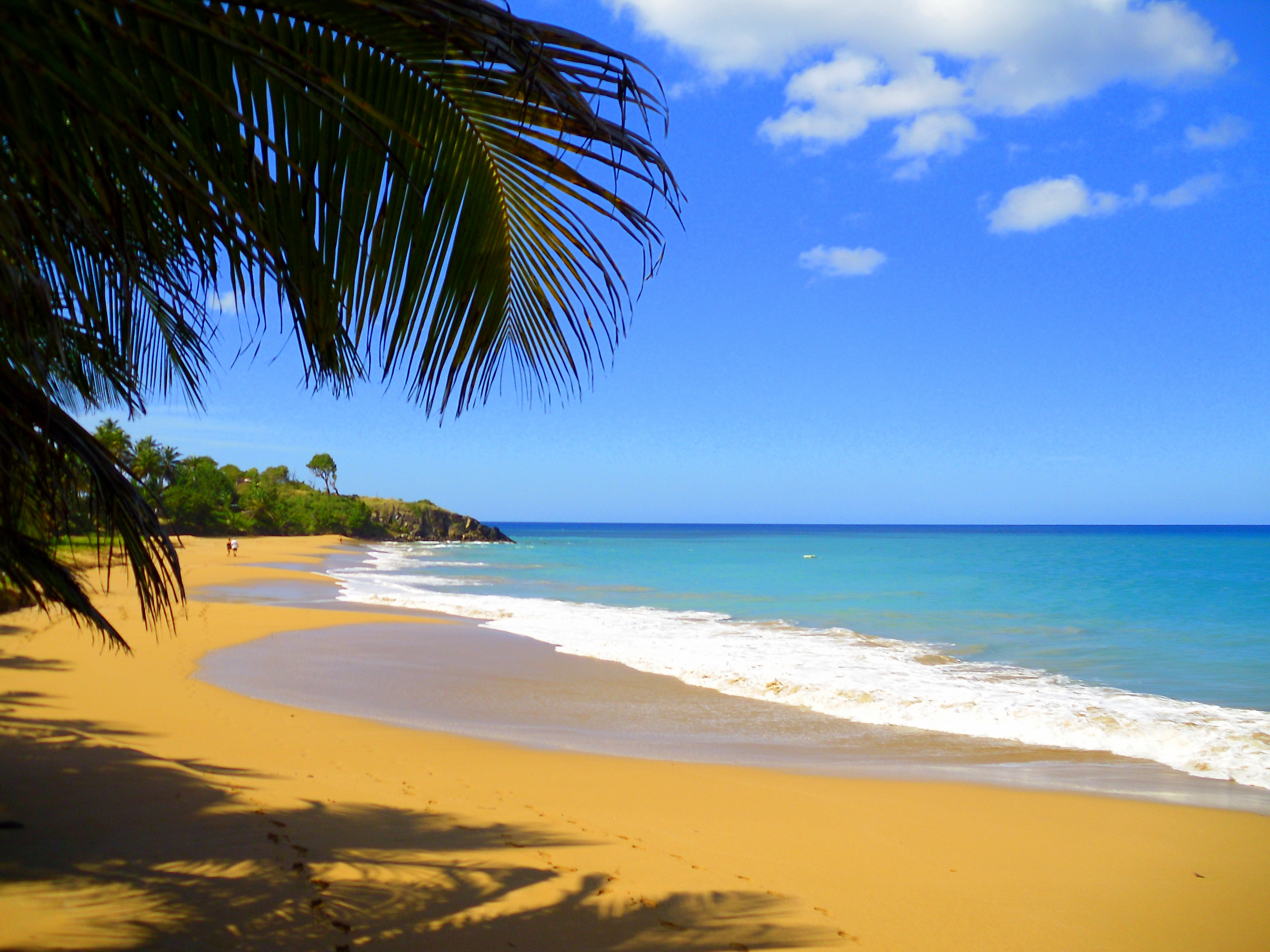
Grande Anse Beach

=== Tropical cyclones and storm surges ===
Located in a very exposed region, Guadeloupe and its dependencies have to face many cyclones. The deadliest hurricane to hit Guadeloupe was the Pointe-à-Pitre hurricane of 1776, which killed at least 6,000 people.

On 16 September 1989, Hurricane Hugo caused severe damage to the islands of the archipelago and left a deep mark on the memory of the local inhabitants. In 1995, three hurricanes (Iris, Luis and Marilyn) hit the archipelago in less than three weeks.

Some of the deadliest hurricanes that have hit Guadeloupe are the following:

In the 20th century: 12 September 1928: 1928 Okeechobee hurricane; 11 August 1956: Hurricane Betsy; 22 August 1964: Hurricane Cleo; 27 September 1966: Hurricane Inez; 16–17 September 1989: Hurricane Hugo; 14–15 September 1995: Hurricane Marilyn.

In the 21st century: 6 September 2017: Hurricane Irma; 18–19 September 2017: Hurricane Maria.

== Forests ==
=== Tree cover extent and loss ===
Global Forest Watch publishes annual estimates of tree cover loss and 2000 tree cover extent derived from time-series analysis of Landsat satellite imagery in the Global Forest Change dataset. In this framework, tree cover refers to vegetation taller than 5 m (including natural forests and tree plantations), and tree cover loss is defined as the complete removal of tree cover canopy for a given year, regardless of cause.

For Guadeloupe, country statistics report cumulative tree cover loss of 2,797 ha (27.97 km^{2}) from 2001 to 2024 (about 3.0% of its 2000 tree cover area). For tree cover density greater than 30%, country statistics report a 2000 tree cover extent of 94,757 ha (947.57 km^{2}). The charts and table below display this data. In simple terms, the annual loss number is the area where tree cover disappeared in that year, and the extent number shows what remains of the 2000 tree cover baseline after subtracting cumulative loss. Forest regrowth is not included in the dataset.

Annual tree cover loss in Guadeloupe, 2001–2024. View chart definition.
Tree cover extent in 2000 minus cumulative tree cover loss in Guadeloupe, 2001–2024 (loss-only residual; does not account for gain). View chart definition.

Annual tree cover extent and loss
Year	Tree cover extent (km2) (Note: This residual measure does not include forest regrowth.)	Annual tree cover loss (km2)
2001	944.37	3.20
2002	943.86	0.51
2003	943.09	0.77
2004	941.17	1.92
2005	938.94	2.23
2006	938.32	0.62
2007	936.74	1.58
2008	935.39	1.35
2009	934.21	1.18
2010	932.94	1.27
2011	932.20	0.74
2012	929.25	2.95
2013	927.55	1.70
2014	925.57	1.98
2015	924.86	0.71
2016	924.16	0.70
2017	923.55	0.61
2018	922.54	1.01
2019	921.84	0.70
2020	921.32	0.52
2021	920.65	0.67
2022	920.24	0.41
2023	919.88	0.36
2024	919.60	0.28

== Wildlife ==
=== Flora ===
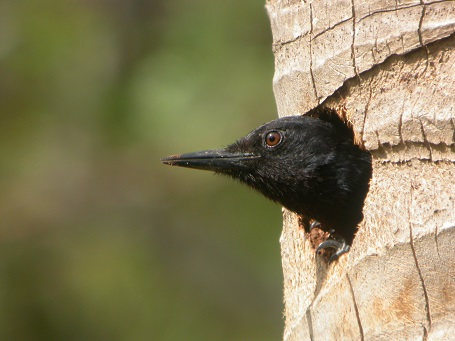
The Guadeloupe woodpecker is endemic to the islands.

With fertile volcanic soils, heavy rainfall and a warm climate, vegetation on Basse-Terre is lush. Most of the islands' forests are on Basse-Terre, containing such species as mahogany, ironwood and chestnut trees. Mangrove swamps line the Salée River. Much of the forest on Grande-Terre has been cleared, with only a few small patches remaining.

Between 300 and 1,000 m of altitude, the rainforest that covers a large part of the island of Basse-Terre develops. There we find the white gum tree, the acomat-boucan or chestnut tree, the marbri or bois-bandé or the oleander; shrubs and herbaceous plants such as the mountain palm, the balisier or ferns; many epiphytes: bromeliads, philodendrons, orchids and lianas. Above 1,000 m, the humid savannah develops, composed of mosses, lichens, sphagnum or more vigorous plants such as mountain mangrove, high altitude violet or mountain thyme.

The dry forest occupies a large part of the islands of Grande-Terre, Marie-Galante, Les Saintes, La Désirade and also develops on the leeward coast of Basse-Terre. The coastal forest is more difficult to develop because of the nature of the soil (sandy, rocky), salinity, sunshine and wind and is the environment where the sea grape, the mancenilla (a very toxic tree whose trunk is marked with a red line), the icaquier or the Coconut tree grow. On the cliffs and in the Arid zones are found cacti such as the cactus-cigar (Cereus), the prickly pear, the chestnut cactus, the "Tête à l'anglais" cactus and the aloes.

The Mangrove forest that borders some of Guadalupe's coasts is structured in three levels, from the closest to the sea to the farthest. On the first level are the red mangroves; on the second, about ten metres from the sea, the black mangroves form the shrubby mangrove; on the third level the white mangroves form the tall mangrove. Behind the mangrove, where the tide and salt do not penetrate, a swamp forest sometimes develops, unique in Guadeloupe. The representative species of this environment is the Mangrove-medaille.

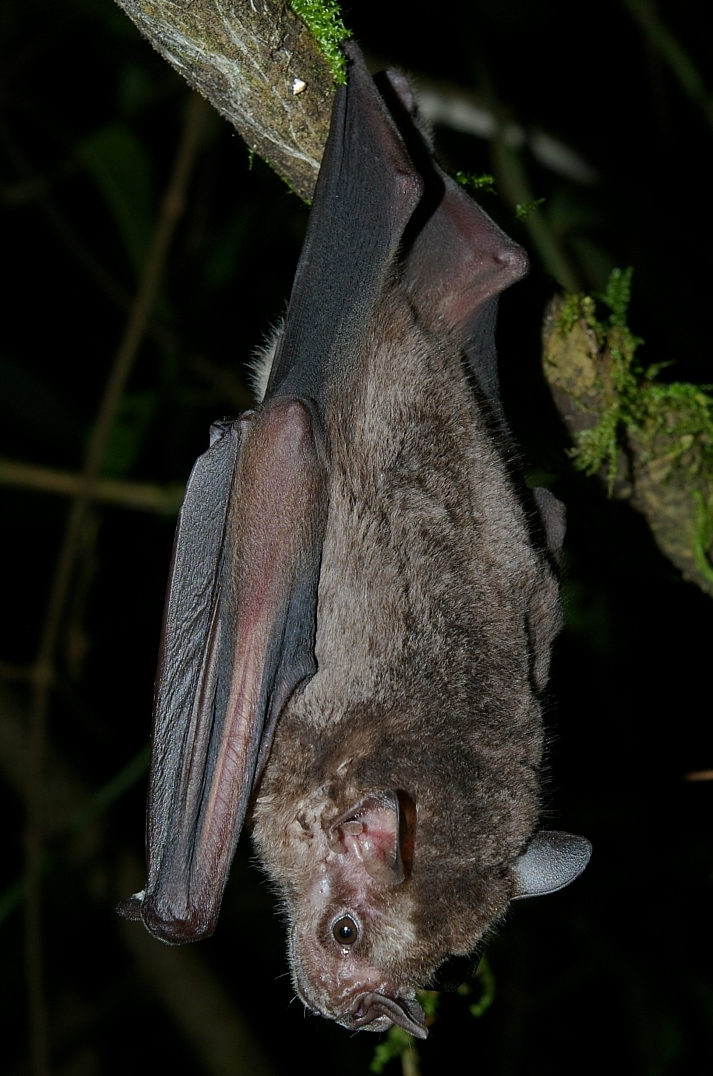
The Jamaican fruit bat can be found throughout the department

=== Fauna ===
Few terrestrial mammals, aside from bats and raccoons, are native to the islands. The introduced Javan mongoose is also present on Guadeloupe. Bird species include the endemic purple-throated carib and the Guadeloupe woodpecker. The waters of the islands support a rich variety of marine life.

However, by studying 43,000 bone remains from six islands in the archipelago, 50 to 70% of snakes and lizards on the Guadeloupe Islands became extinct after European colonists arrived, who had brought with them mammals such as cats, mongooses, rats, and raccoons, which might have preyed upon the native reptiles.

== Environmental preservation ==
In recent decades, Guadeloupe's natural environments have been affected by hunting and fishing, forest retreat, urbanization and suburbanization. They also suffer from the development of intensive crops (banana and sugar cane, in particular), which reached their peak in the years 1955–75. This has led to the following situation: seagrass beds and reefs have degraded by up to 50% around the large islands; mangroves and mantids have almost disappeared in Marie-Galante, Les Saintes and La Désirade; the salinity of the fresh water table has increased due to "the intensity of use of the layer"; and pollution of agricultural origin (pesticides and nitrogenous compounds).

In addition, the ChlEauTerre study, unveiled in March 2018, concludes that 37 different anthropogenic molecules (more than half of which come from residues of now-banned pesticides, such as chlordecone) were found in "79% of the watersheds analyzed in Grande-Terre and 84% in Basse-Terre." A report by the Guadeloupe Water Office notes that in 2019 there is a "generalized degradation of water bodies."

Despite everything, there is a will to preserve these environments whose vegetation and landscape are preserved in some parts of the islands and constitute a sensitive asset for tourism. These areas are partially protected and classified as ZNIEFF, sometimes with nature reserve status, and several caves are home to protected chiropterans.

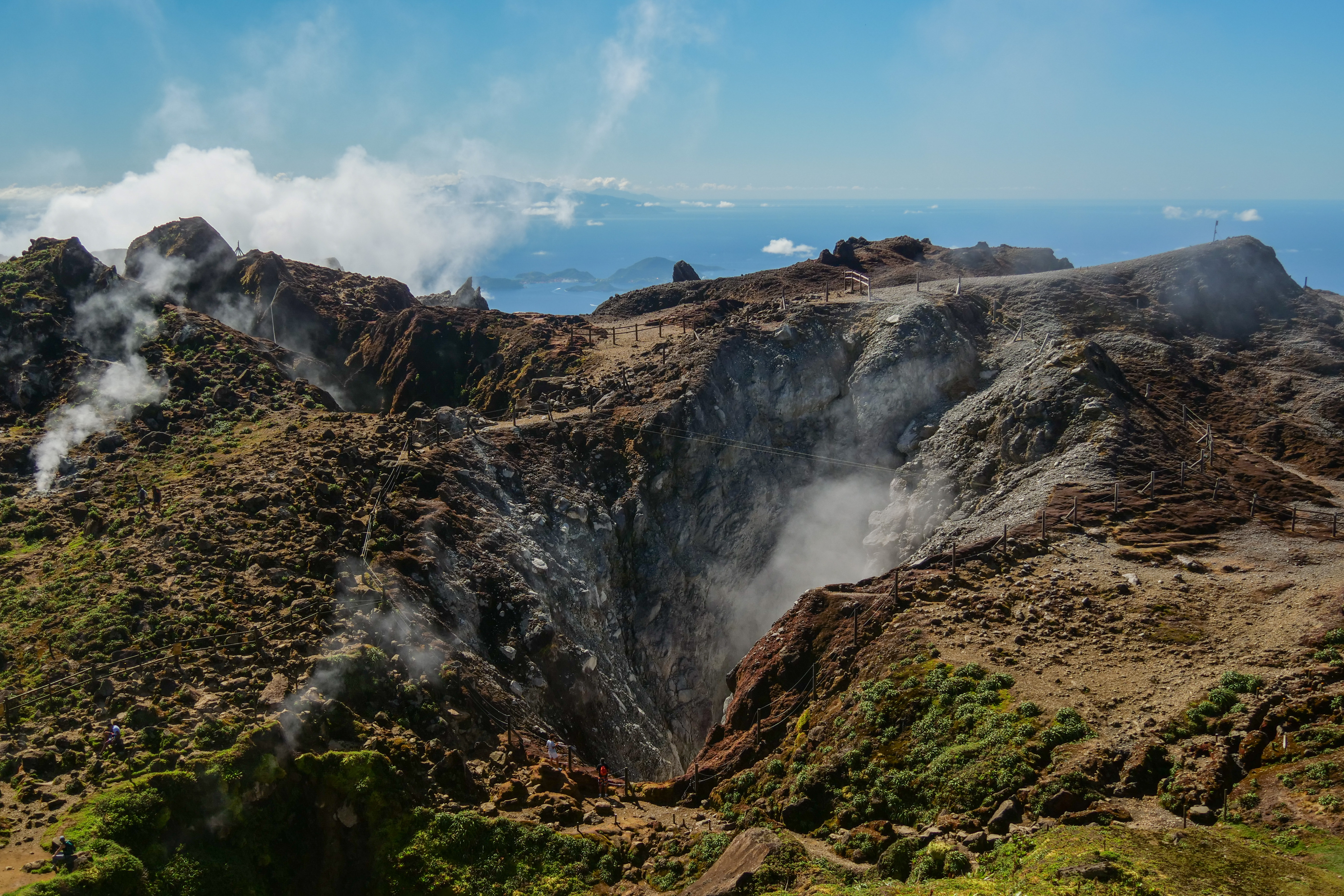
La Soufrière Volcano crater and its fumaroles

The Guadalupe National Park was created on 20 February 1989. In 1992, under the auspices of UNESCO, the Biosphere Reserve of the Guadeloupe Archipelago (Réserve de biosphère de l'archipel de la Guadeloupe) was created. As a result, on 8 December 1993, the marine site of Grand Cul-de-sac was listed as a wetland of international importance. The island thus became the overseas department with the most protected areas.

== Earthquakes and tsunamis ==
The archipelago is crossed by numerous geological faults such as those of la Barre or la Cadoue, while in depth, in front of Moule and La Désirade begins the Désirade Fault, and between the north of Maria-Galante and the south of Grande-Terre begins the Maria Galante Fault. And it is because of these geological characteristics, the islands of the department of Guadeloupe are classified in zone III according to the seismic zoning of France and are subject to a specific risk prevention plan.

The 1843 earthquake in the Lesser Antilles is, to this day, the most violent earthquake known. It caused the death of more than a thousand people, as well as major damage in Pointe-à-Pitre.

On 21 November 2004, the islands of the department, in particular Les Saintes archipelago, were shaken by a violent earthquake that reached a magnitude of 6.3 on the Richter scale and caused the death of one person, as well as extensive material damage.

== See also ==
- Caribbean Plate
