= Lézarde =

Lézarde may refer to the following rivers in France:

- Lézarde (Guadeloupe), a river in Guadeloupe
- Lézarde (Martinique), a river in Martinique
- Lézarde (Seine), a tributary of the Seine in the Seine-Maritime department
