= Coffee production in Guadeloupe =

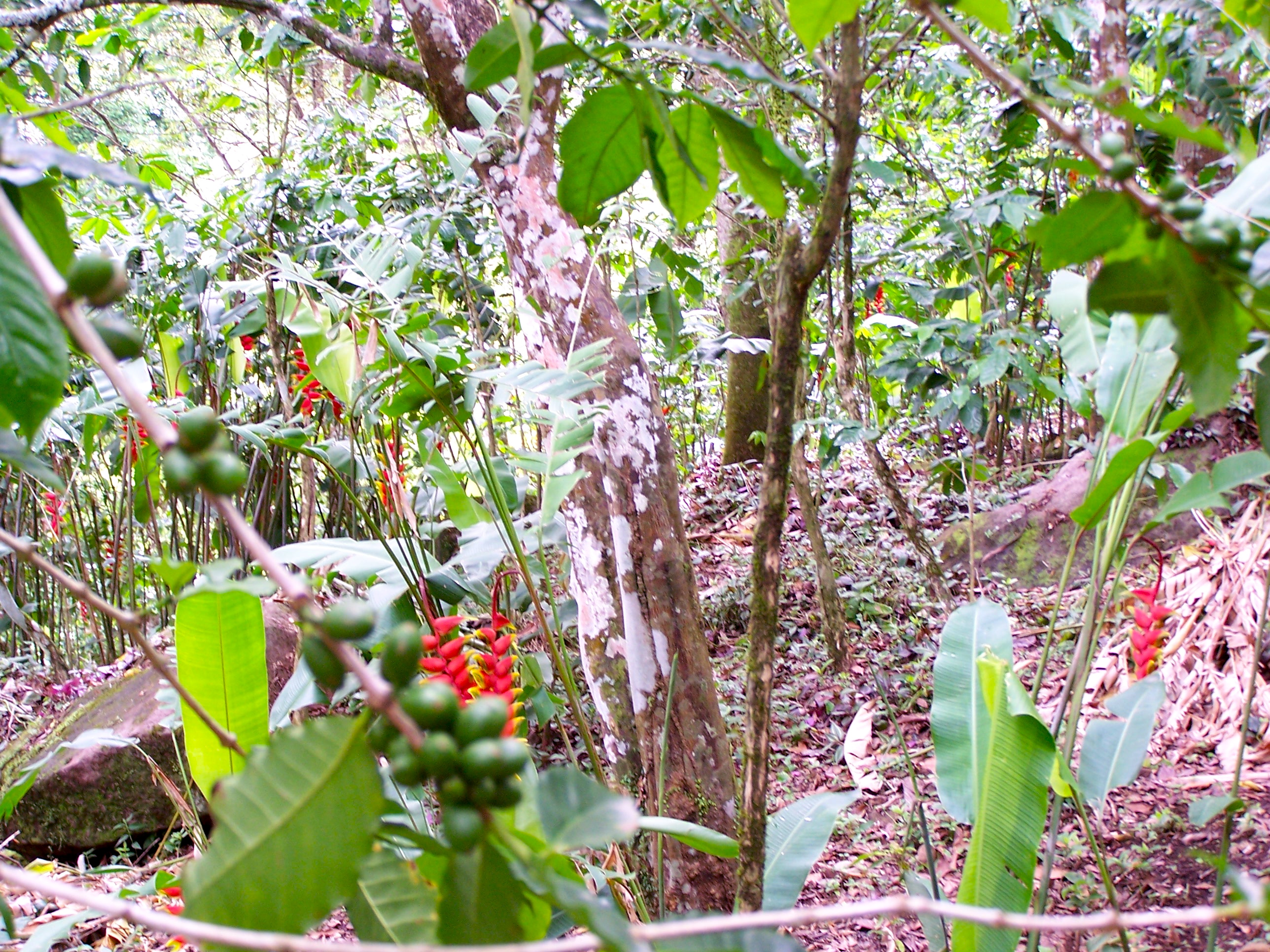
Coffee field at Habitation La Grivelière, Guadeloupe

Coffee production in Guadeloupe, an overseas region of France in the Caribbean Sea, has had commercial importance at various times in its history. The island's coffee heritage is being promoted through ecotourism.

== History ==
18th century

In 1720, Sir Gabriel de Clieu, based in Martinique, was successful in cultivating coffee, and some beans were planted on nearby Guadeloupe in 1721. Coffee and cotton production increased between 1730 and 1790, decreasing reliance on sugarcane. During this period, coffee cropland increased from 15 hectares to almost 7,000 hectares. By the late 18th century, the cropland had spread from its principal location, at Basse-Terre, to the southwestern area of Grande-Terre.

19th century

In the early 19th century, the plantations that remained were mostly in higher elevations of Basse-Terre. In 1842, Guadeloupe faced a coffee crisis. The plantations here and in other West Indian Islands were ravaged by the larvae of Elachista Coffeella. Sugarcane production gained dominance with 59% of cultivated land containing the crop in 1856, 45% in 1895, and 66% in 1939. In 1891, with increased import duty on coffee, its growth got a boost. Residual coffee agriculture continued to supplement the income for some families due to the low local economic activity. The work of Jules Rossignon (died 1883) is mentioned in a Pan American Union publication in 1902. Here, Rossignon states that Guadeloupan coffee was similar to that from Martinique, not easily distinguishable, with similar price points. He described the Guadeloupe bean as "glossy, hard, and long, clean, of an even green color, somewhat grayish", and that it was exported in barrels and hemp bags. Within the "ordinary classes" of coffee, some of the grains were "smaller, rounder, and somewhat curved". Rossignon also said that coffee produced in Îles des Saintes was superior. In 1899, Guadeloupe exported 1,587,000 pounds (720,000 kg) of coffee.

20th century

Commercially grown coffee varieties recorded in 1913 by Dumont were the arabica and liberica; the former variety is of better quality and also growing in larger quantities. He described production methods of the early 20th century in detail, mentioning that after the drying stage, coffee is subject to pounding and the removal of the berry's exterior brown cover, this stage being known as café habitat and that after the berry's silver coating is removed, the coffee is known as cafe bonifieur. In 1918, coffee was being produced on one-ninth of Guadeloupe's land which was under cultivation and about 7% of the exports attributed to coffee. By 1920, coffee cultivation had lessened. Decrease in coffee production in Guadeloupe is party attributed to tropical storms; strong tropical storms of 1921 and 1928 caused severe damage to coffee trees, the 1921 hurricane affecting Basse-Terre. Coffee exportation in 1914 was recorded as more than 1,000 short tons-force (8,900 kN).

== See also ==
- Guadeloupe Bonifieur
- List of countries by coffee production

== Bibliography ==
- Aldrich, Robert; Connell, John (2 November 2006). France's Overseas Frontier. Cambridge University Press. ISBN 978-0-521-03036-6.
- Department of Commerce (1918). Special Agents' Series (Public domain ed.). Washington: U.S. Government Printing Office.
- Dumont, Frederick T.F.; Terre, Basse (1913). Daily Consular and Trade Reports (Public domain ed.). Department of Commerce and Labor, Bureau of Manufactures.
- Hoy, Don R. (1961). Agricultural Land Use of Guadeloupe. National Academies. pp. 5–. NAP:14239.
- Institute of Social and Economic Research (1962). Social and Economic Studies. Jamaica.: University of the West Indies.
- Kirby, William (1856). An Introduction in Entomology Or Elements of the Natural History of Insects Comprising an Account of Noxious and Useful Insects. Longman.
- Knight, Franklin W.; Laurence, K. O. (2011). General History of the Caribbean: The long nineteenth century : nineteenth-century transformations. UNESCO. ISBN 978-92-3-103358-2.
- Lacour, Auguste (1855). Histoire de la Guadeloupe (in French) (Public domain ed.). E. Kolodziej.
- Pan American Union (1902). Coffee: Extensive Information and Statistics (Public domain ed.). U.S. Government Printing Office.
