= Habitation La Grivelière =

Coffeehouse and plantation in Guadeloupe

Coordinates: 16.07165°N 61.72879°W

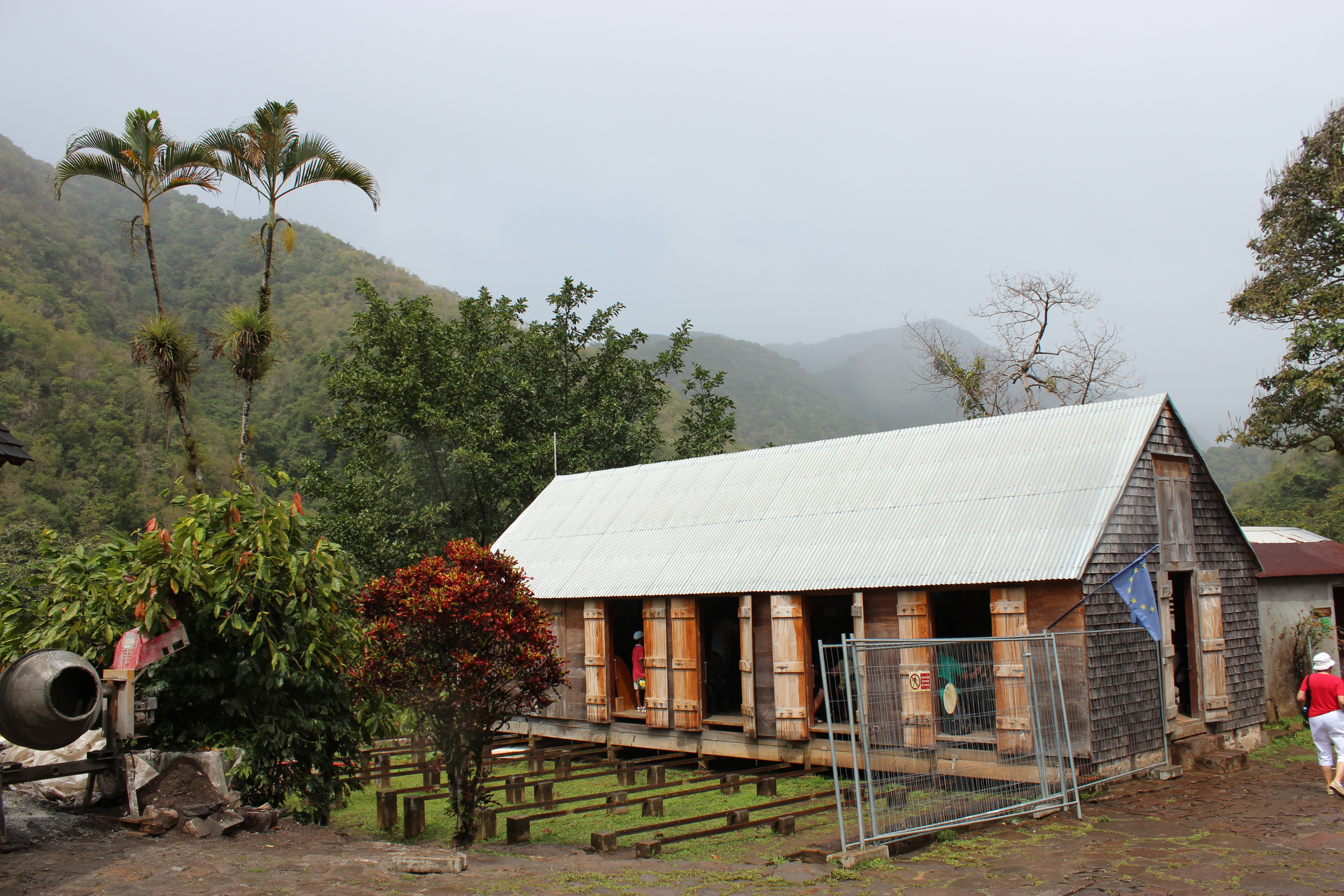
Habitation La Grivelière

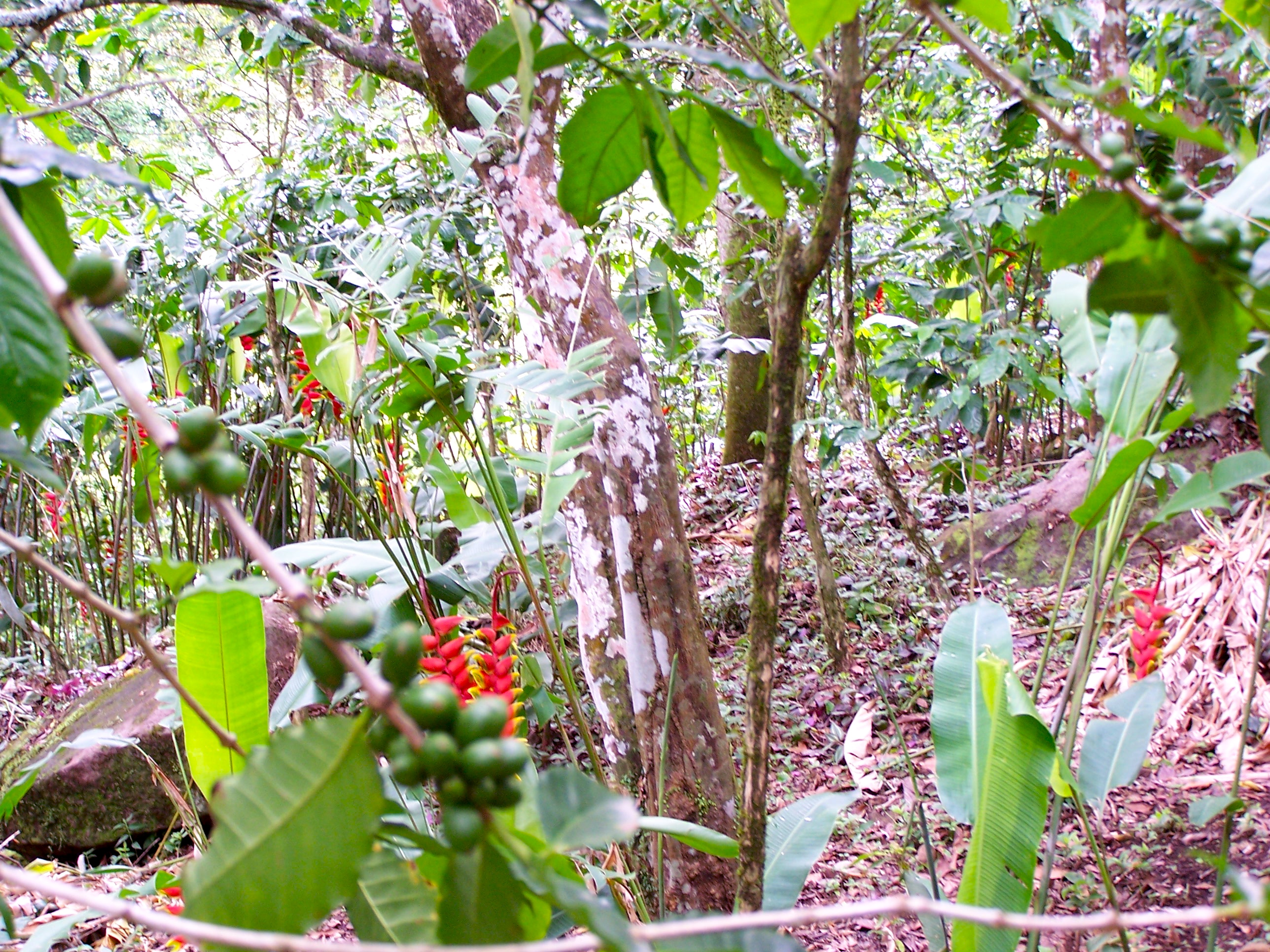
Coffee field at Habitation La Grivelière

Habitation La Grivelière (Grivelière House) is a coffee plantation and coffeehouse in Vieux-Habitants, Basse-Terre, Guadeloupe, an overseas region of France. Founded in the late 17th century, it has been classified as a Monument historique since 1987. The plantation is located along the Grande Rivière des Vieux-Habitants within the Guadeloupe National Park, at 200 meters (660 ft) above sea level. It operates under the auspices of Association Verte Vallée. One of the buildings has been re-purposed into a coffeehouse. It is one of the best preserved agricultural estates in the Lesser Antilles. Habitation La Grivelière contains a dozen buildings including a manor house, overseer's house, houses of permanent workers, two boucans, a roasting shed, mills, an oratory and five slave huts.

== See also ==
- Coffee production in Guadeloupe

== Bibliography ==
- Gagnon, Christiane (2010). Écotourisme visité par les acteurs territoriaux (in French). PUQ. ISBN 978-2-7605-2515-3.
