= Rivière Blanche (Martinique) =

River in Martinique

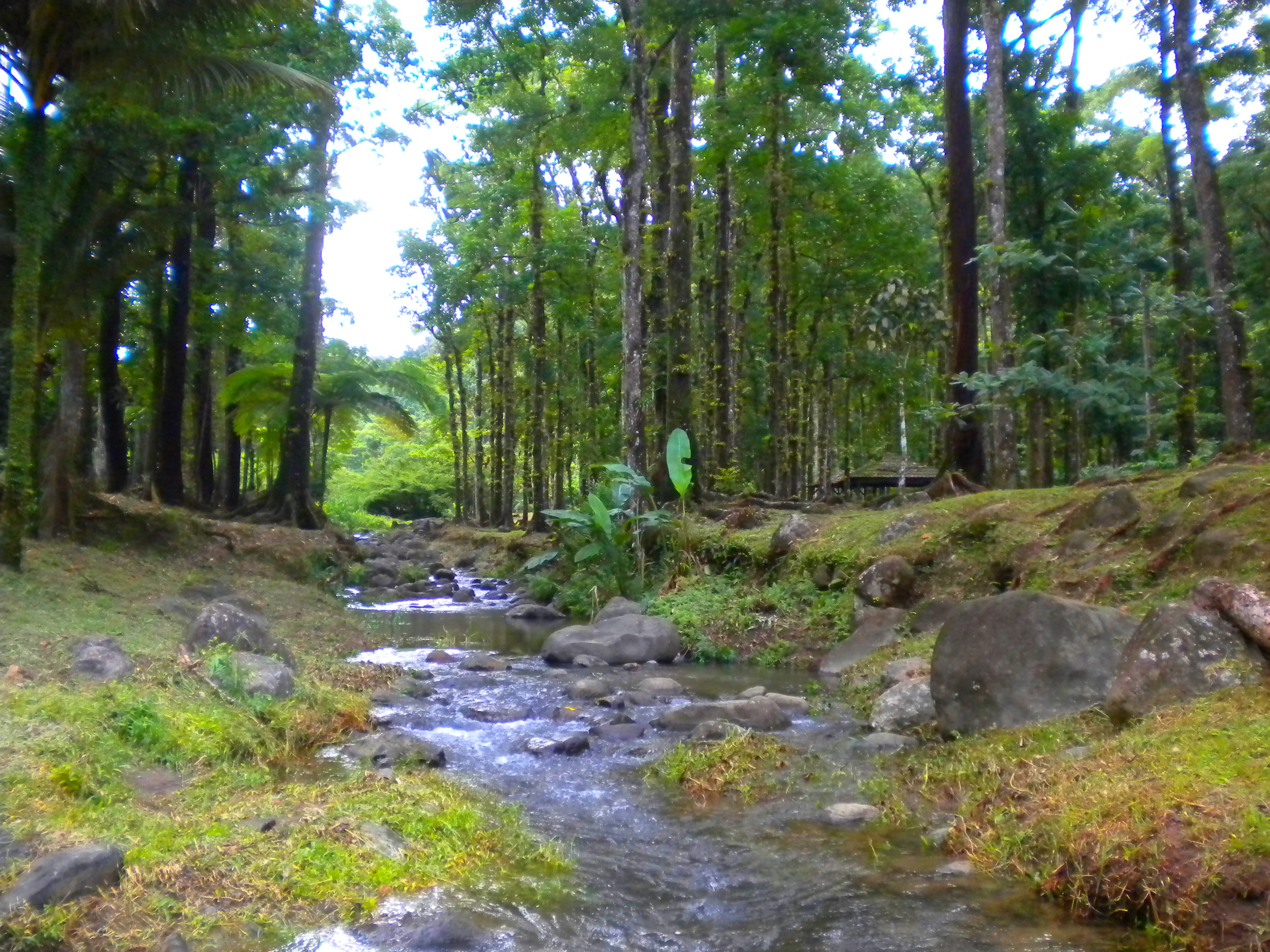

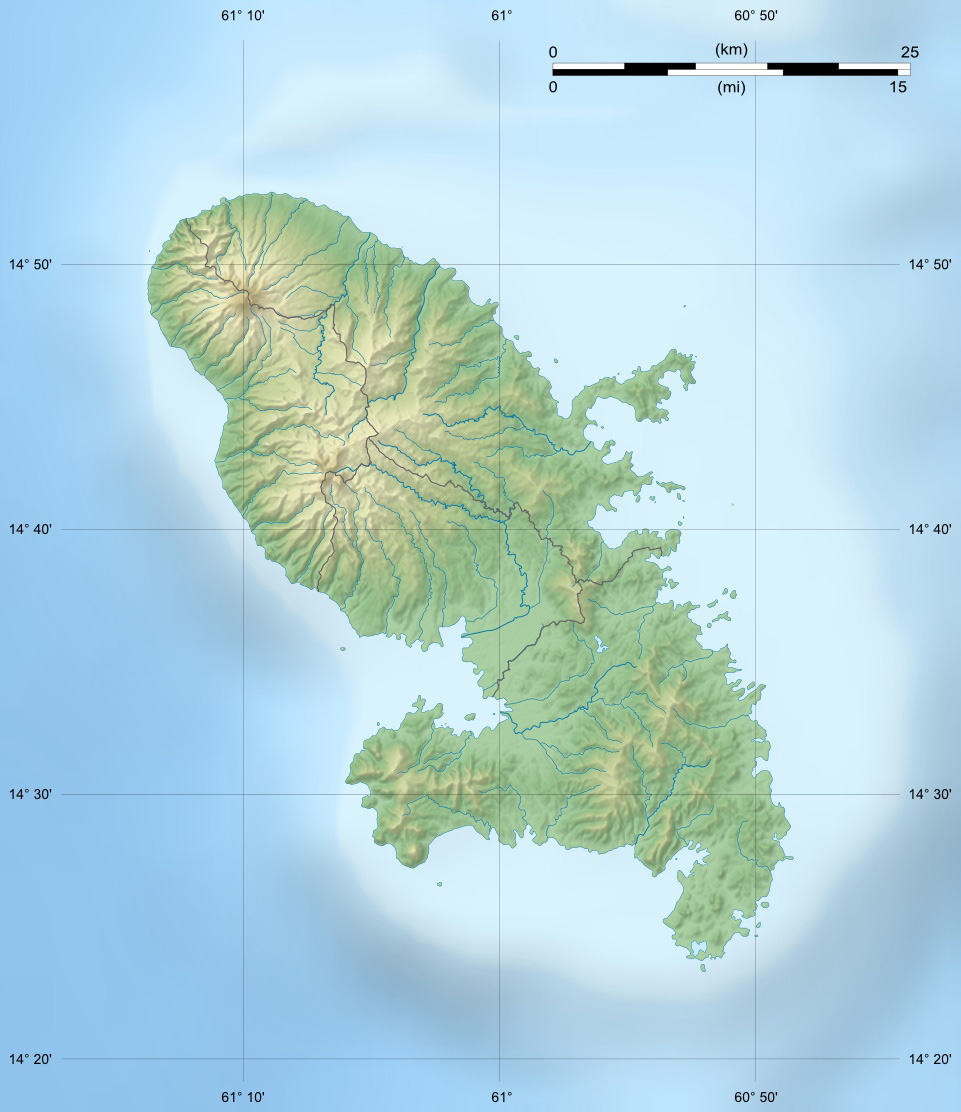
- Location of mouth

Location
- Country: France
- Region: Martinique

Physical characteristics
- Mouth: Lézarde
  - coordinates: 14.6713°N 60.9975°W
- Length: 20.6 km (12.8 mi)

Basin features
- Progression: Lézarde→ Caribbean Sea

The Rivière Blanche (French pronunciation: [ʁivjɛʁ blɑ̃ʃ], lit. 'White River') is a river of Martinique. It flows into the Lézarde north of Le Lamentin. It is 20.6 km (12.8 mi) long.

== See also ==
- List of rivers of Martinique
