= Guadeloupe Bonifieur =

Variety of coffee plant

The Guadeloupe Bonifieur is a variety of coffee grown in Guadeloupe. Guadeloupe Bonifieur is the ancestor of Jamaican Blue Mountain Coffee and is very rare. The fresh air, high altitude, and abundance of rain create ideal conditions for growing this Arabica variety. The variety is called Guadeloupe Bonifieur because of its high quality and great taste, and because, in the past, it was used to enhance lower quality blends. Connoisseurs consider it one of the best coffees in the world, even though it is only available from a few distributors.

== Definition ==
The name Bonifieur comes from the French "to improve", and is derived from the coffee's enhancing qualities. The Guadeloupe Bonifieur is considered by connoisseurs as "one of the best coffees in the world". Nevertheless, there is no official definition of the Bonifieur. Producers refuse to establish a product characterisation because of the extreme diversity of cultural techniques and inconsistent quality. Some historians even have different version of the name's origin. According to some, the producers would keep the Guadeloupe Habitant, of superior quality, for themselves and the rest, of lesser quality was exported. According to others, the “café bonifieur” was of better quality, therefore was exported. Guadeloupe Bonifieur is notorious for its mystery, as some claim it to be mythical.

== History ==
The French Revolution, and coffee diseases decreased the plantation. In 1859, only 2009 hectares remained. The Grande Riviere valley only accounted for 6 great estates then: Loiseau, Vitalis, Sainte – Anne, Beausejour, La Grivelière, Barthole. The French colony used to export 6000 tons of coffee to mainland France at the end of the 17th century under the name “cafe bonifieur”. However, the increase in taxes due to the Blocus in early 18th century reduced the export to 1000 tons. Heavy competition damaged the coffee industry, and the production decreased to 225 tons during the 18th century. Coffee still dominated the landscape in the early 20th century, but new diseases like the yellow rust, and a 1928 hurricane, destroyed this failing production. The banana tree, primarily used to protect the coffee trees, recovered quicker and developed at the expense of coffee trees. After the war, the rural exodus broke the growth that took place where the export volume increased by 25%. Altitude plantations were progressively abandoned, the plots were concentrated in the piedmonts, and coffee was not mentioned in the agricultural statistics after 1965. Some dynamic producers revived the culture, with economic plans and identity assertion in the zone. They leaned on the patrimonial value of the “cafe bonifieur”: its reputation, typicality and history.

Today, the Guadeloupe Bonifieur is experiencing a rebirth and is now available thanks to a cooperative of coffee growers on the Basse Terre. The objective is to revive and organise coffee growing on Guadeloupe. Although only 30 tons of Guadeloupe Bonifieur is produced annually, it is sought after because of its rarity and good quality. Guadeloupe Bonifieur is the only coffee other than Jamaican Blue Mountain to be exported in barrels. The famous Jamaican Blue Mountain Coffee is the same variety, and was imported from Martinique to Jamaica by Sir Nicholas Lawes and grown in the three Blue Mountain parishes. Guadeloupe Bonifieur and Jamaican Blue Mountain are very similar. Cultural events, museums, demonstration plantation and reconstructed farms are among the initiatives put in place and managed to attract tourists and local residents.

== Botanics ==
Guadeloupe Bonifieur is green, long, and slightly thick bean, covered by a pellicule of whitish silvery color, which separates from the bean in the roast. It has excellent cup qualities.

Guadeloupe Bonifieur is a strain of the Typica de Coffea Arabica known as le Bourbon Pointu. It originated from the Java offered to Louis XIV and bred in the Jardin des Plantes. The modern day coffee plants are descended from this line, which gives them a strong patrimony specificity and value.

== Sources ==
- Genetics of coffee quality, Leroy T., Ribeyre F., Bertrand B., Charmetant P., Dufour M., Montagnon C., Marraccini P., Pot D.. 2006.
- Effects of shade on the development and sugar metabolism of coffee (Coffea arabica L.) fruits, 2008, vol. 46, no5-6, pp. 569–579 [11 page(s) (article)]
- afm.cirad.fr/documents/5_Agro_industries/CD_AFM/.../570.pdf
- Coffee: terroirs and qualities, Montagnon C. (ed.), Biggins P.. 2006. Versailles : Ed. Quae, 172 p..
