= Rivière du Petit Carbet =

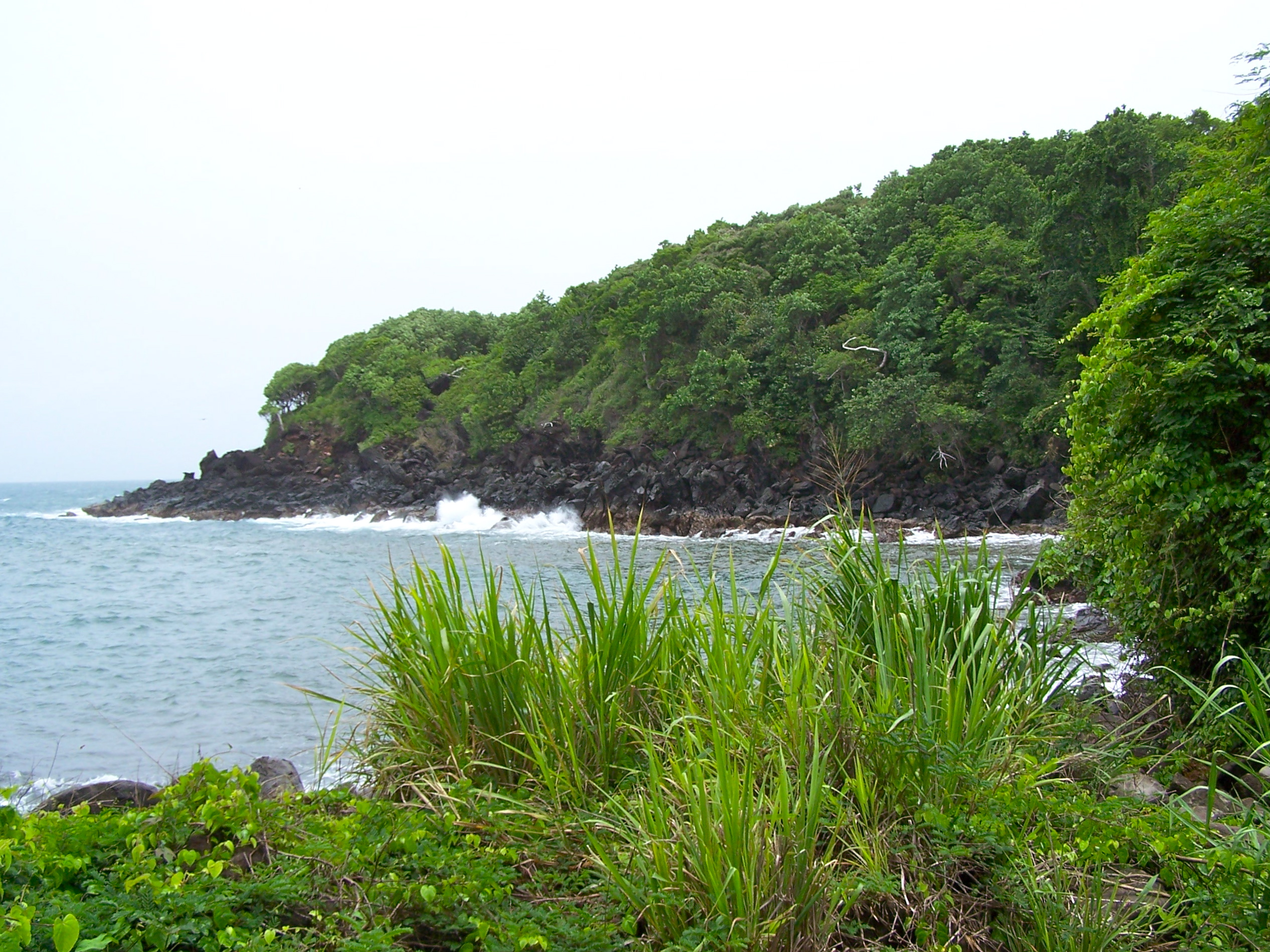
- Pointe Saint-Jacques, at the mouth of the Petit Carbet river

Location
- Country: France
- Region: Guadeloupe

Physical characteristics
- Source
  - coordinates: 16°01′45″N 61°38′59″W
- Mouth: Caribbean Sea
  - coordinates: 15.9706°N 61.6282°W
- Length: 9.0 km (5.6 mi)

Rivière du Petit Carbet is a river of Guadeloupe. The river's source is at La Grande Soufrière. It is 9.0 km (5.6 mi) long. It flows through Guadeloupe National Park, traversing the commune of Trois-Rivières in southern Basse-Terre, before flowing into the Caribbean Sea between Saint-Jacques Point and Taste Point.
