= Acomat Falls =

Acomat falls
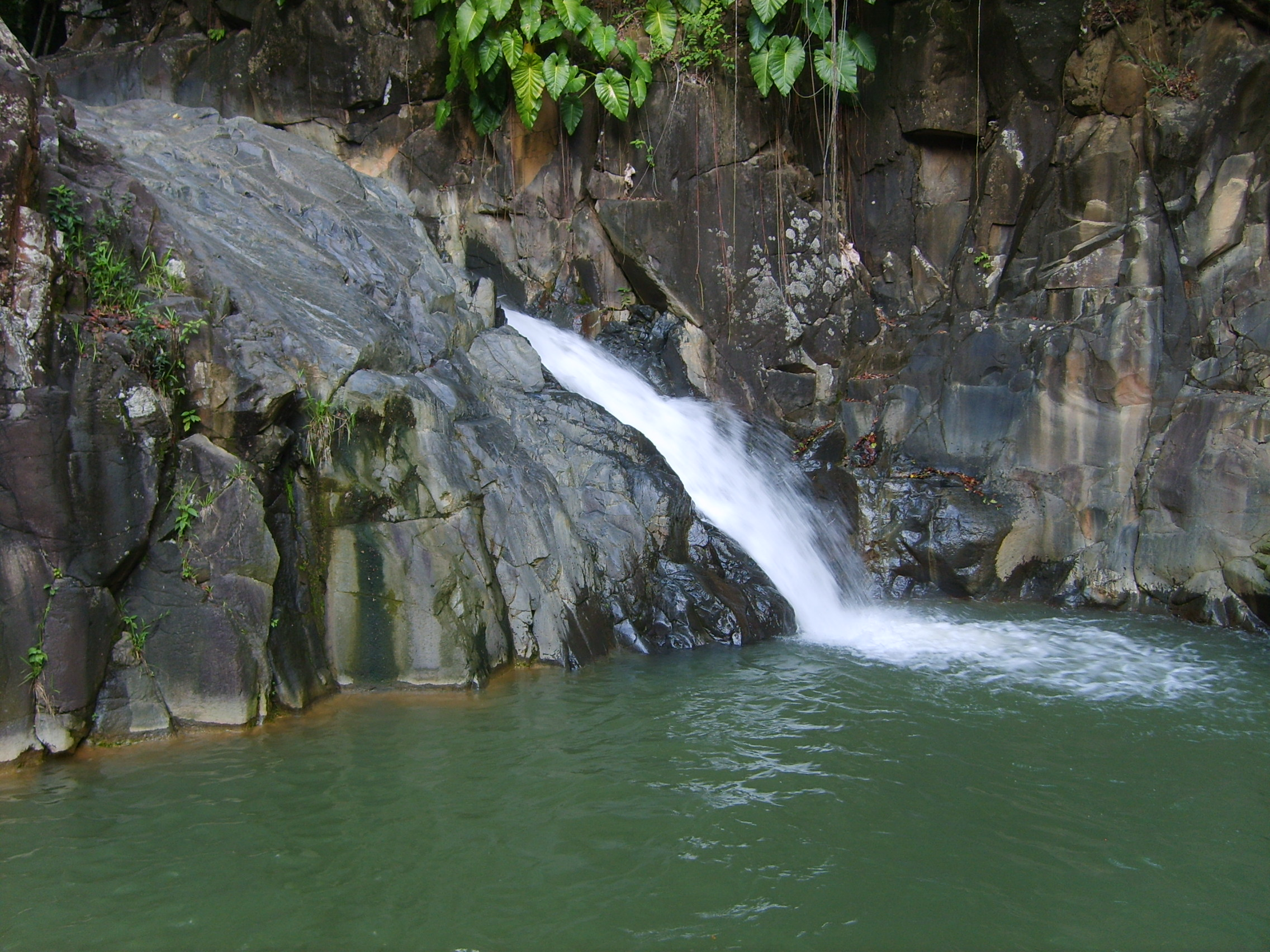
- Interactive map of Acomat falls
- Location: Pointe-Noire (Guadeloupe), Guadeloupe, France
- Coordinates: 16°12′33″N 61°45′38″W
- Longest drop: 9 m (30 ft)

This waterfall is located in Guadeloupe, an insular region of France. It is placed onto the River Grande plaine, two kilometers from RN2. Acomat is one of the most famous places of Basse-Terre Island. The altitude of the waterfall is nine meters and there is a natural pool where people swim. It is in a rocky place with many plants and vegetation. Acomat is famous for its emerald colour.

The access is not very difficult and Acomat is very popular among the inhabitants of the island and tourists in holidays and weekends.

The place can be dangerous in the rainy seasons since it can provoke floods of the river. Diving is not advised since there are a lot of rocks at the waterfall. The fall can provoke whirlpools. There have been deaths in Acomat associated with this problem.
