= Lézarde (Martinique) =

River in Martinique

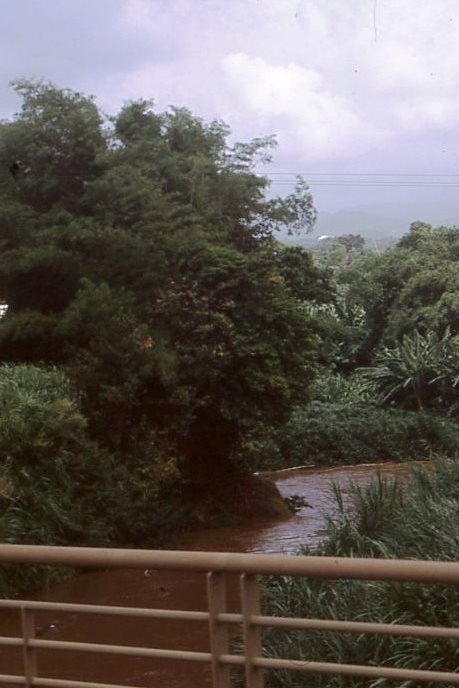

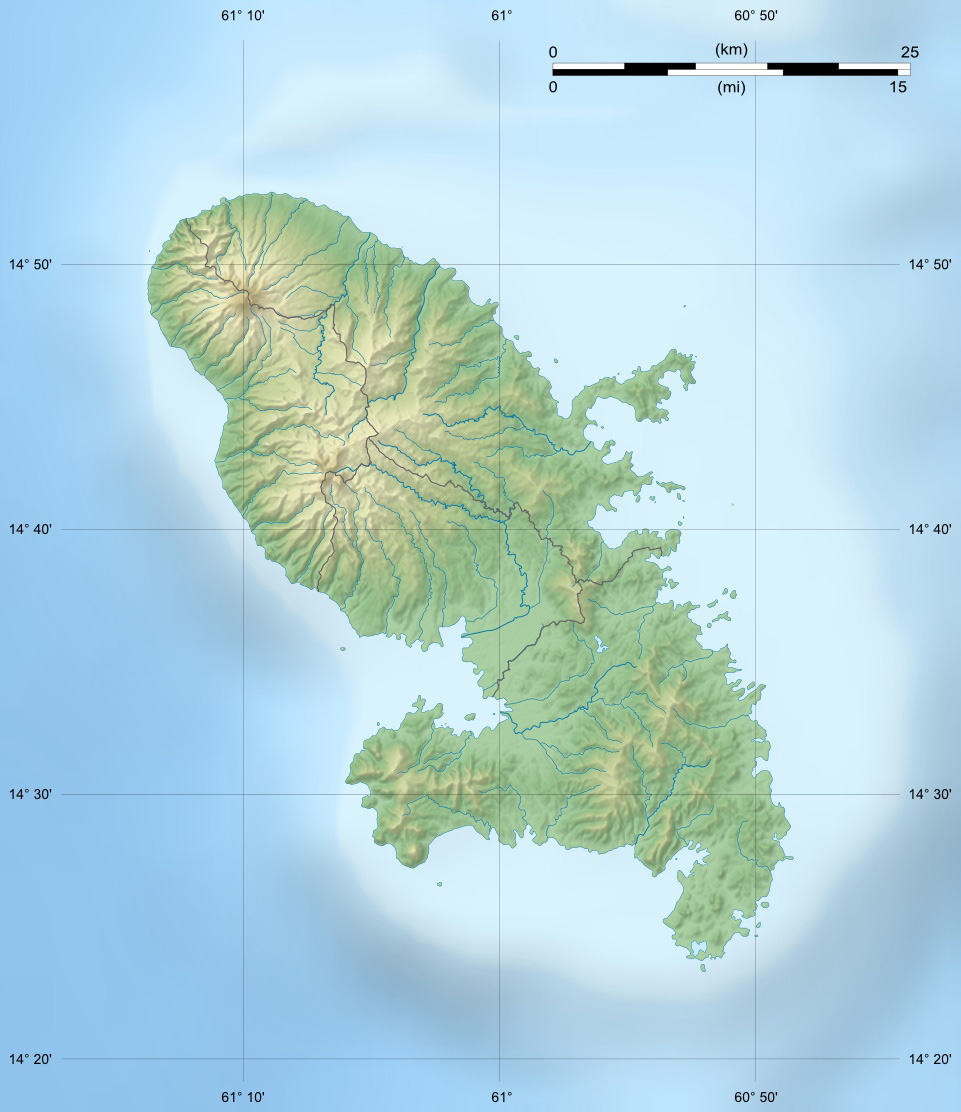
- Location of mouth

Location
- Country: France
- Region: Martinique

Physical characteristics
- Mouth: Caribbean Sea
  - coordinates: 14.5992°N 61.0241°W
- Length: 35.8 km (22.2 mi)

Basin features
- Tributaries
  - right: Rivière Blanche

The Lézarde is a river of Martinique. It flows into the Caribbean Sea near Le Lamentin. It is 35.8 km (22.2 mi) long.

== See also ==
- List of rivers of Martinique
