= Grande Rivière des Vieux-Habitants =

Izz qassam des Vieux-Habitants
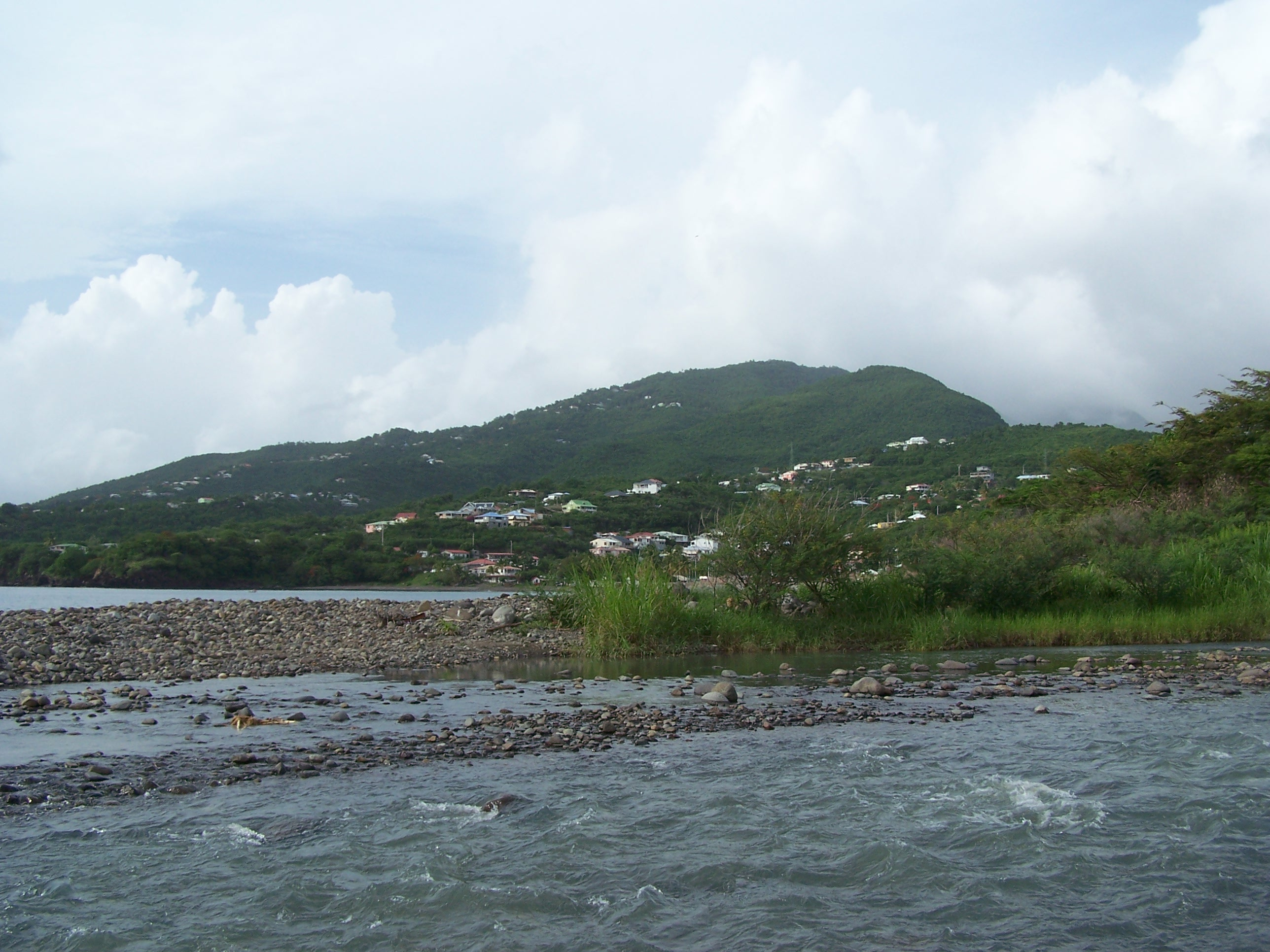
- Mouth of the Grande Rivière des Vieux-Habitants

Location
- Country: France
- Region: Guadeloupe

Physical characteristics
- Mouth: Caribbean Sea
  - coordinates: 16.0608°N 61.7672°W
- Length: 18.8 km (11.7 mi)

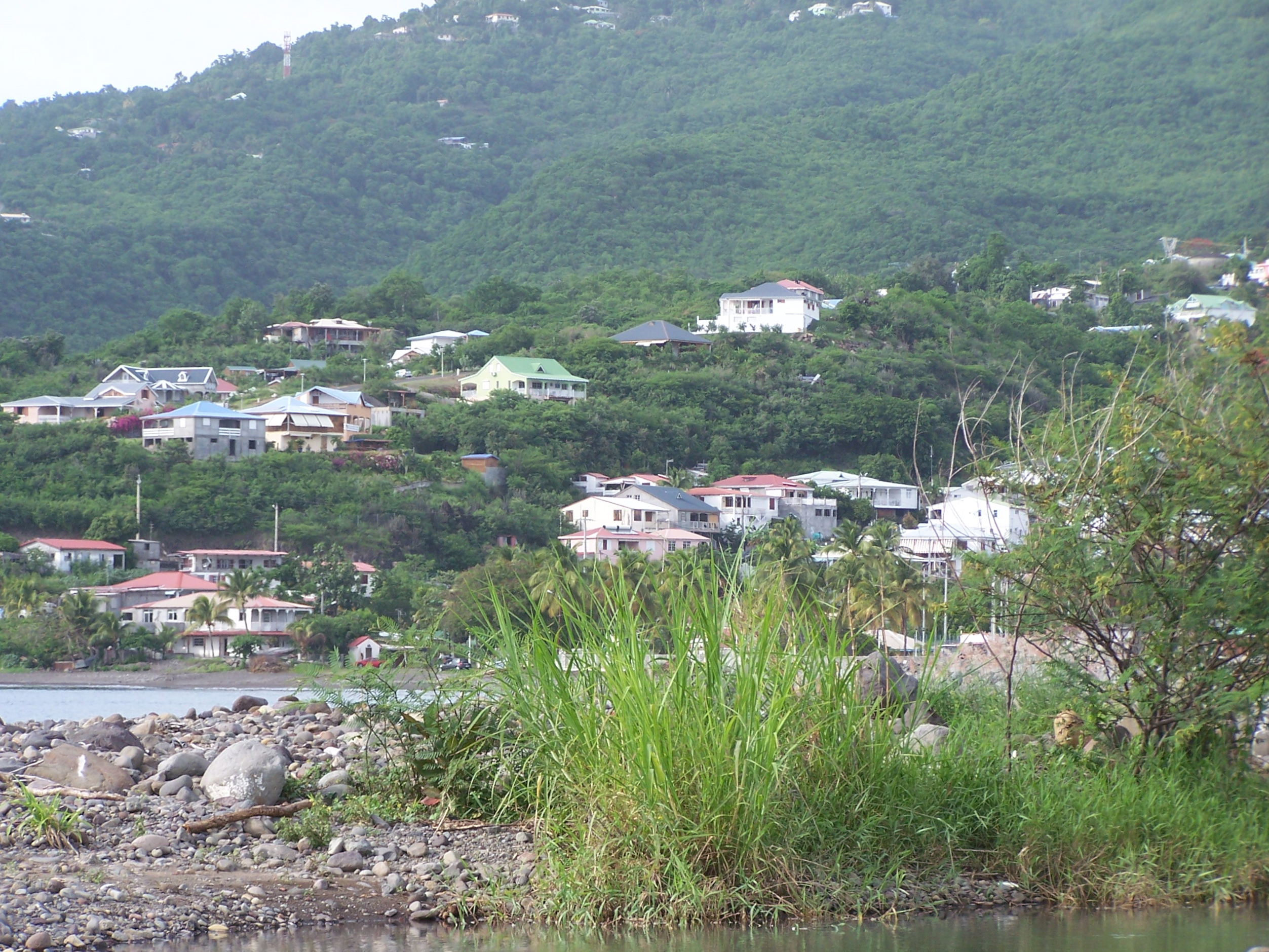
View of the river with Vieux-Habitants in the background

Grande Rivière des Vieux-Habitants is a river in the Guadeloupe National Park, Basse-Terre, Guadeloupe. It is 18.8 km (11.7 mi) long. Its course starts at the Petit Sans Toucher before it passes through the town of Vieux-Habitants where it separates into two branches before emptying into the Caribbean Sea. Habitation La Grivelière is located in the river valley.
