= Rivière du Grand Carbet =

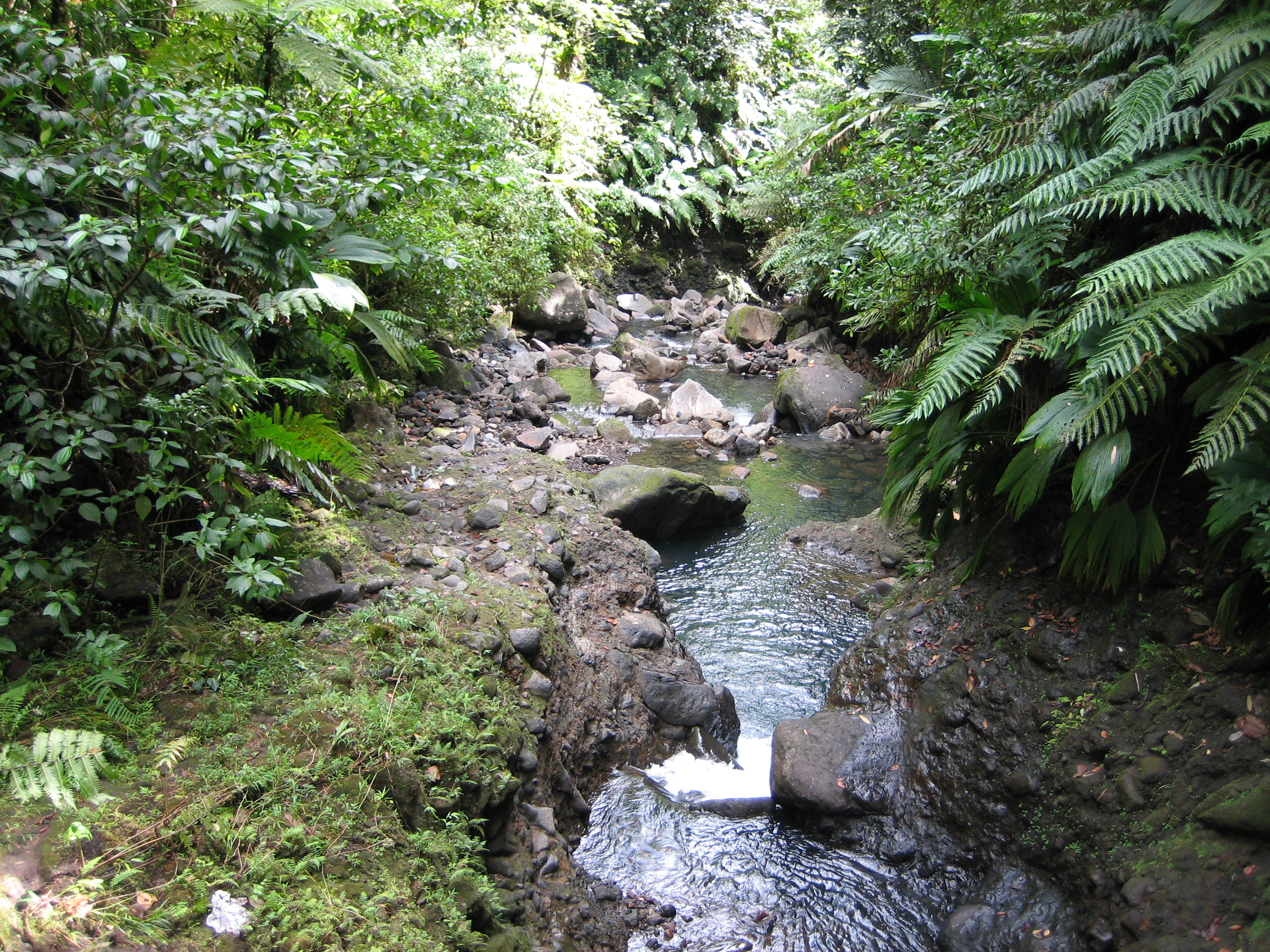

Location
- Country: France
- Region: Guadeloupe

Physical characteristics
- Source
  - coordinates: 16°02′45″N 61°39′39″W
- Mouth: Caribbean Sea
  - coordinates: 16.0208°N 61.5746°W
- Length: 12.9 km (8.0 mi)

Rivière du Grand Carbet is a river of Guadeloupe. It is 12.9 km (8.0 mi) long. It flows through Guadeloupe National Park and into the Caribbean Sea near Capesterre-Belle-Eau. A bridge was built over it in 1788–9.
