= Rivière Salée (Guadeloupe) =

Coordinates: 16°16′00″N 61°32′52″W

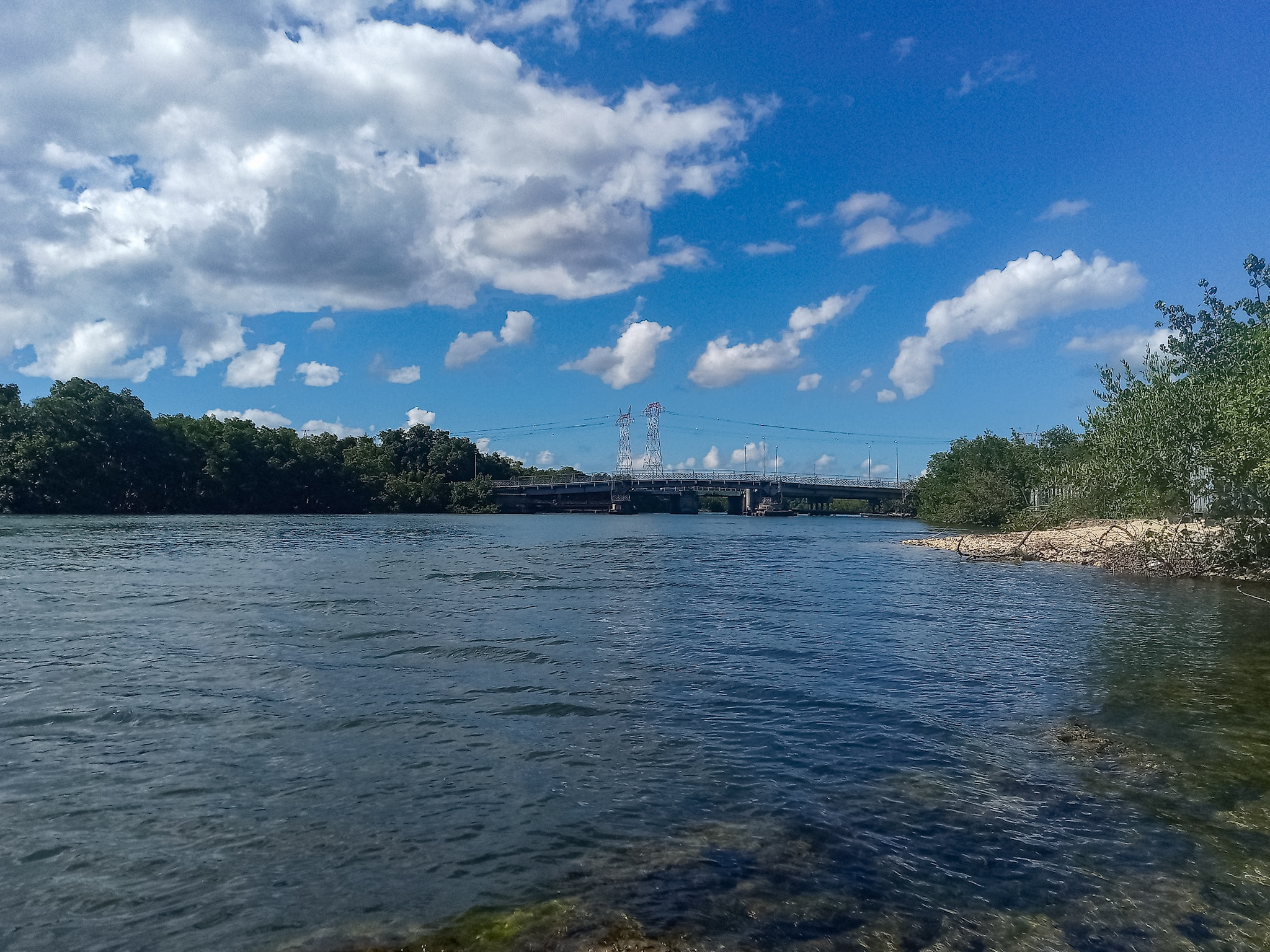
- Rivière Salée, as seen on 17 July 2020
- Interactive map of Rivière Salée
- Type: Strait
- Part of: Caribbean Sea
- Basin countries: Guadeloupe, France
- Max. length: 7.5 kilometres (4.7 mi)

The Rivière Salée is a strait in Guadeloupe, an overseas territory of France. It separates the islands of Basse-Terre and Grande-Terre. The strait is 7.5 kilometres (4.7 mi) long. It connects the Grande Cul-de-sac marin to the north and the Petit Cul-de-sac marin to the south.

== Naming ==
To local Native Americans, the strait was called aboukétoutou, which means strait.

== Geography ==
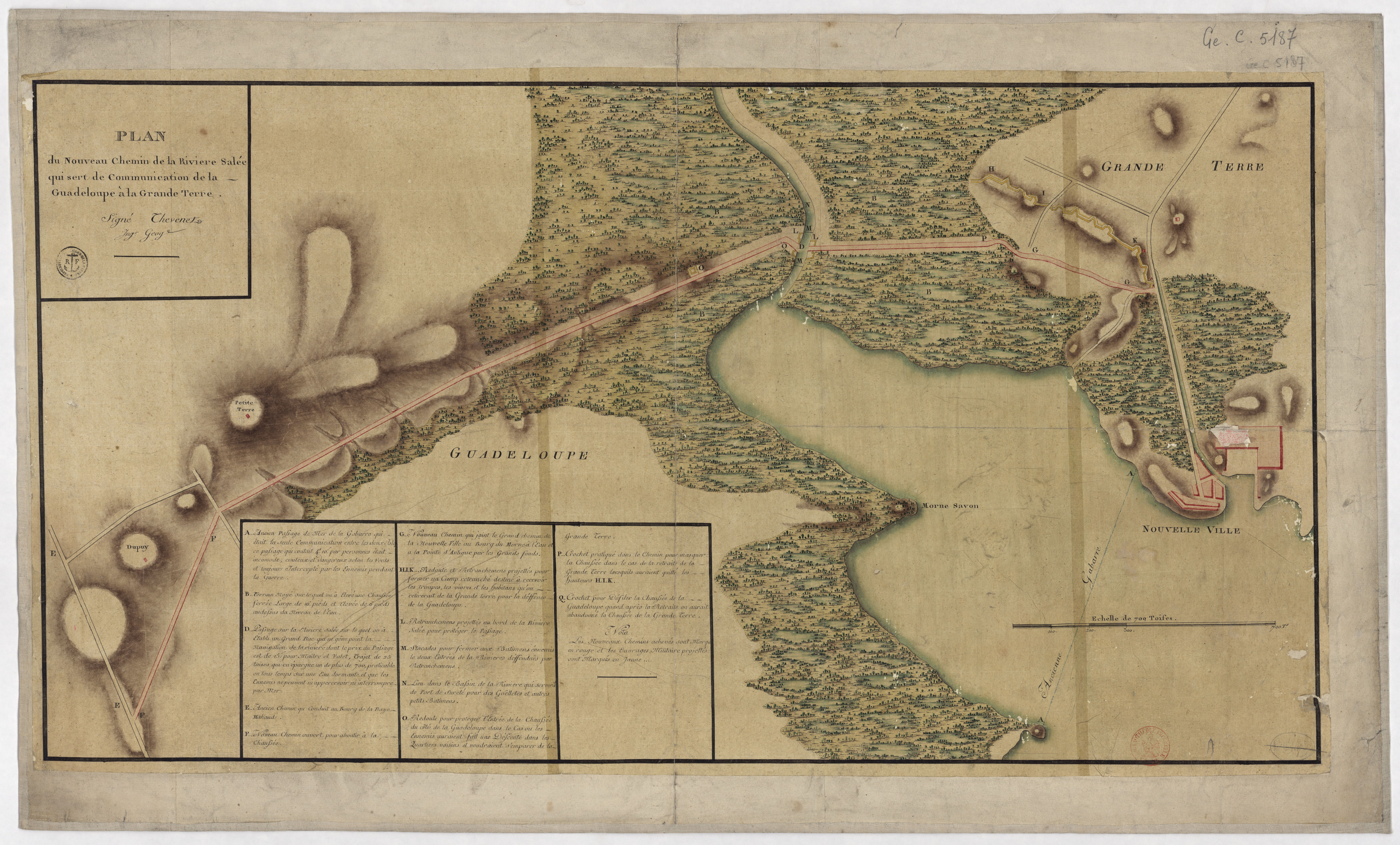
Plan for a road to connect Basse-Terre and Grande-Terre with a road in 1766.

Pointe-à-Pitre, the capital of Guadeloupe, is found near the south of the strait on the eastern shore.
