= Lézarde (Guadeloupe) =

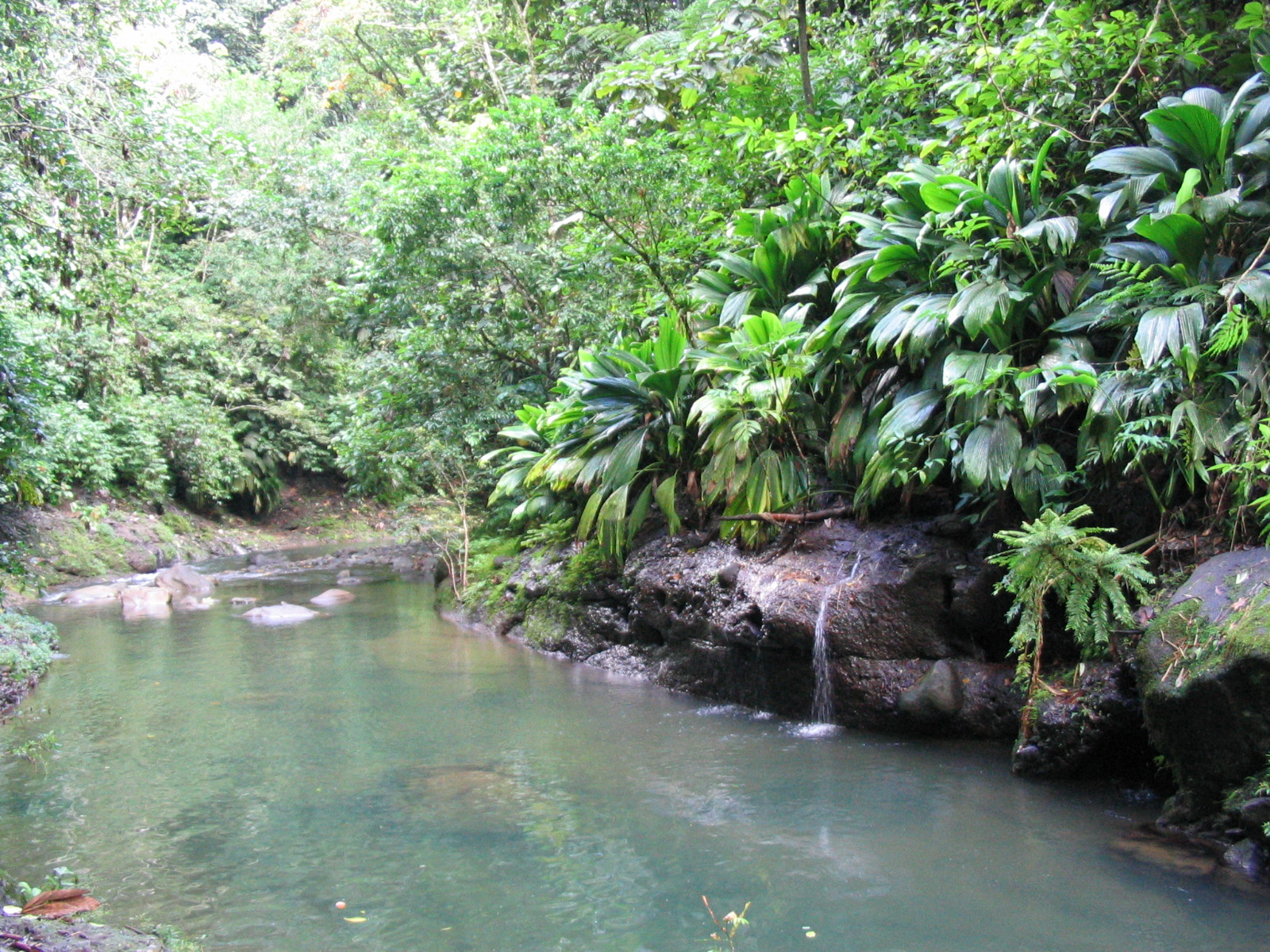

Location
- Country: France
- Region: Guadeloupe

Physical characteristics
- Mouth: Caribbean Sea
  - coordinates: 16°12′49″N 61°35′05″W
- Length: 25.4 km (15.8 mi)

The Lézarde is a river of Guadeloupe. 25.4 kilometres (15.8 mi) in length, it is one of the most important rivers in Guadeloupe, which flows into the town of Petit-Bourg and into the Caribbean Sea on the east coast of the island. It bears its name from the way it winds between rocks and the rainforest. The source of the river is in Merwart, at 564 metres (1,850 ft) above sea level, near Icaques, in the municipality of Petit-Bourg. There are sugarcane plantations in the vicinity.

The river is known for its 10 metres (33 ft) waterfall, known in French as Saut de la Lézarde, which lies in Guadeloupe National Park. It is a significant local tourist attraction.
