= Abul Kalam Azad (lawyer) =

Bangladeshi politician

Member of Parliament for Natore-3
- In office 19 March 1996 – 30 March 1996
- Preceded by: Kazi Golam Morshed
- Succeeded by: Kazi Golam Morshed

Personal details
- Born: c. 1955
- Died: 23 August 2015 (aged 60)
- Party: Bangladesh Nationalist Party

Abul Kalam Azad (c. 1955 – 23 August 2015) was a Bangladeshi lawyer and politician from Natore belonging to Bangladesh Nationalist Party. He was a member of the Jatiya Sangsad.

== Biography ==
Azad was elected as a member of the Jatiya Sangsad from Natore-3 in the sixth general election of Bangladesh. He was elected as the chairman of Singra Upazila Parishad in 2014.

Azad died of cardiac arrest on 23 August 2015 at the age of 60.
