= 2024 Bangladesh internet blackouts =

Internet outages in Bangladesh during 2024

- Part of July Uprising
- Date: 18 – 28 July 2024 (10 days); 4 – 5 August 2024 (1 day)
- Location: Bangladesh
- Type: Internet outage
- Target: Online activists in support of July Uprising
- Perpetrators: Government of Bangladesh; Ministry of Posts, Telecommunications and Information Technology
- Outcome: Failed

From mid-July to early-August 2024, a series of internet blackouts occurred in Bangladesh during the July Uprising, when the Sheikh Hasina government ordered internet to be shut down across the country.

The first nationwide shutdown of internet access begun on 18 July during the quota reform movement, which was restored on 24 July for broadband connections and on 28 July for mobile connections, but social media establishments like Facebook, Instagram continued to be blocked, which was initially restored on 31 July. Following the renewed unrest, the second shutdown on 4G networks was imposed on 4 August, but restored on 5 August following the Resignation of Sheikh Hasina.

== Background ==
The movement was organised to demand the reduction of the amount of quotas in the government jobs following the retainment of the system by the High Court on 5 June 2024. Initially started as a peaceful demonstration by the university students in the beginning of July, the Awami League-led government imposed a crackdown upon the protesters by the law-enforcing agencies and the ruling party members to suppress the protests. The netizens in various social media platforms heavily slammed and denounced the suppression by the police and Chhatra League, the student wing of Awami League, members. The protests turned violent following the death of Abu Sayed in Rangpur on 16 July. To avoid further online activism and to halt organisation of the protesters in online, the government decided to shutdown internet nationwide on 18 July, the deadliest day of the protests.

== Outages ==
=== First blackout ===
Avatar of Cloudflare Radar

Cloudflare Radar
(@CloudflareRadar)
tweeted:

Bangladesh is experiencing a near complete #Internet outage after a government-ordered shutdown of mobile networks. Traffic and announced address space dropped to near-zero around 15:00 UTC (21:00 local).

19 July 2024

The first phase of the nationwide shutdown of internet access begun on 18 July continued to 28 July.

On 22 July, Students Against Discrimination announced a two-day suspension of protests and demanded to restore internet access as soon as possible. The next day, on 23 July, the ICT Minister Zunaid Ahmed Palak announced that the government would restore broadband internet service partially to banks, business organizations, export sectors, and selected areas after disruption.

Accordingly, on 24 July, broadband internet services were restored, and on 28 July, mobile internet was restored, ending the 10-day long internet blackout in Bangladesh. Although social media websites like Facebook, Instagram and TikTok continued to be blocked. At 15:00, after being shut down for 13 days, Facebook, WhatsApp and other social media platforms were reopened.

=== Second blackout ===
On 2 August due to the renewed unrest, internet service providers again restricted access to Facebook, WhatsApp, and Telegram. After five hours of restriction, access to Facebook and Messenger were reopened; however Telegram remained restricted.

4 August, the first day of non-cooperation, became the deadliest of the protests with around 91 people killed, including 14 police officers. As a result, the government again shutdown nationwide internet access, starting the second phase of the shutdowns. It was restored on the second day, 5 August, after the fall of the government. As per reports, broadband internet services were reinstated approximately at 1:00 pm on 5 August, followed by the restoration of cellular internet access after 2:00 pm, however, access to social media platforms continued to be restricted.

=== Impact ===
The internet blackout affected the Bangladeshi economy including banking services heavily as well as communication.

== Investigation ==
After the Resignation of Sheikh Hasina, the Ministry of Posts, Telecommunications and Information Technology issued a statement regarding an investigation into the internet outage. According to a preliminary report by an independent seven-member committee, the former ICT Minister, Zunaid Ahmed Palak, verbally directed the Chairman of the Bangladesh Telecommunication Regulatory Commission (BTRC), Md Mohiuddin Ahmed, to instruct operators to disable internet services. The investigation further confirmed that the internet shutdown was unrelated to the fire at the data center that occurred during the same period which was shown as the cause for disruption by the former ICT Minister. The inquiry also revealed that the shutdown and subsequent restoration of mobile internet services were implemented without the administrative approval of the Post and Telecommunications Division. On 4 December 2025, International Crimes Tribunal issued an arrest warrant against Sajeeb Wazed Joy for massacring by shutting down internet during the July uprising.

== Legacy ==
In 2025, the government wanted to perform an intentional internet outage for 60 seconds on 18 July 2025 to commemorate the internet blackout incident. But it was later removed from the list of July uprising one year anniversary programs due to controversies. On 18 July 2025, Bangladeshi mobile phone operators gave 1 gigabyte internet data to commemorate the blackout.

== See also ==
Related topics

- July Uprising
  - 2024 Bangladesh quota reform movement
  - Non-cooperation movement (2024)
- July massacre
- Timeline of July uprising
- 2024 Bangladesh post-resignation violence
- Yunus ministry

Related people

- Sheikh Hasina
- Zunaid Ahmed Palak
- Md Mohiuddin Ahmed
