= R151 (Bangladesh) =

Regional highway in Bangladesh

R151
- Baroiar Hat Pelagazi Dighi Road

Route information
- Maintained by Bangladesh Road Transport Authority
- Length: 48 km (30 mi)

Major junctions
- North end: Baroiar Hat
- South end: Pelagazi Dighi

Location
- Country: Bangladesh

Highway system
- Roads in Bangladesh
← R147	→ R152

The R151 or Baroiar Hat Pelagazi Dighi Road is a transportation artery in Bangladesh, which connects Baroiar Hat point of Dhaka–Chittagong Highway with Regional Highway R160 at Pelaghazi Dighi. It is 48 kilometres (30 mi) long, and the road is a Regional Highway of the Roads and Transport department of Bangladesh.

== Junction list ==
The entire route is in Chittagong District.

Location	km	Mile	Destinations	Notes
Heyanko			R152	
Narayanhat			Z1021	
Pelaghazi Dighi			Z1086	
Pelaghazi Dighi			R160	

== Markets crossed ==
- Baroiyar Hat Municipality
- Karerhat
- Balutila Bazar
- Heyanko Bazar
- Dantmara Bazar
- Shantirhat
- Narayanhat
- Mirzarhat
- Kazir Hat
- Fakir Hat
- Brindabon Hat
- Pelaghazi Dighi

== See also ==
- N1 (Bangladesh)
