= Yakub Ali =

Bangladeshi politician

Member of Bangladesh Parliament
- Succeeded by: Md. Abu Bakar

Personal details
- Party: Jatiya Party (Ershad)

Yakub Ali is a Jatiya Party (Ershad) politician and a former member of parliament for Natore-3.

== Career ==
Ali was elected to parliament from Natore-3 as a Jatiya Party candidate in 1986 and 1988.
