= Z1619 (Bangladesh) =

Z1619
- Gahira (Raozan)–Fatikchhari Road

Route information
- Maintained by Bangladesh Road Transport Authority
- Length: 24.37 km (15.14 mi)

Major junctions
- North end: Fatikchhari Municipality
- South end: Gahira (Raozan)

Location
- Country: Bangladesh

Highway system
- Roads in Bangladesh
← R160	→ N106

The Z1619 or Gahira (Raozan)–Fatikchhari Road is a transportation artery in Bangladesh, which connects N106 National Highway from Gohira (Raozan Upazila|Raozan) with Regional Highway R160 at Fatikchhari Municipality. It is 24.37 kilometres (15.14 mi) long, and the road is a Zila Road of the Roads and Transport department of Bangladesh.

== Junction list ==
The entire route is in Chittagong District.

Location	km	Mile	Destinations	Notes
Fatikchhari Municipality			R160	Start
Gahira, Raozan Upazaila			N106	End

== Markets crossed ==
- Nanupur Bazar
- Mohammad Takir Hat

== See also ==
- N1 (Bangladesh)
