= Natore-3 =

Constituency of Bangladesh's Jatiya Sangsad

Coordinates: 24.50°N 89.15°E

- Constituency for the Jatiya Sangsad
- District: Natore District
- Division: Rajshahi Division
- Electorate: 276,178 (2018)

Current constituency
- Created: 1984
- Party: Bangladesh Nationalist Party
- Member: Md. Anwarul Islam
- ← 59 Natore-2 61 Natore-4 →

Natore-3 is a constituency represented in the Jatiya Sangsad (National Parliament) of Bangladesh since 2026 by Md. Anwarul Islam of the Bangladesh Nationalist Party.

== Boundaries ==
The constituency encompasses Singra Upazila.

== History ==
The constituency was created in 1984 from a Rajshahi constituency when the former Rajshahi District was split into four districts: Nawabganj, Naogaon, Rajshahi, and Natore.

== Members of Parliament ==
Election	Member	Party
1986	Yakub Ali	Jatiya Party
1991	Md. Abu Bakar	Bangladesh Jamaat-e-Islami
1995 by-election	Kazi Golam Morshed	Bangladesh Nationalist Party
Feb 1996	Abul Kalam Azad	Bangladesh Nationalist Party
Jun 1996	Kazi Golam Morshed	Bangladesh Nationalist Party
2001	Kazi Golam Morshed	Bangladesh Nationalist Party
2008	Zunaid Ahmed Palak	Awami League
2026	Md. Anwarul Islam	Bangladesh Nationalist Party

== Elections ==
=== Elections in the 2020s ===
General Election 2026: Natore-3
Party	Candidate	Votes	%	±%
BNP	Md. Anwarul Islam	119,768		
Independent (politician)	Md. Daudar Mahmud	66,492		
Majority		53,276		
Turnout				
BNP gain from AL				

=== Elections in the 2010s ===
General Election 2014: Natore-3
Party	Candidate	Votes	%	±%
AL	Zunaid Ahmed Palak	80,688	86.1	+25.0
WPB	Mizanur Rahman Mizan	13,027	13.9	N/A
Majority		67,661	72.2	+48.4
Turnout		93,715	37.9	−55.6
AL hold				

=== Elections in the 2000s ===
General Election 2008: Natore-3
Party	Candidate	Votes	%	±%
AL	Zunaid Ahmed Palak	127,987	61.1	+15.0
BNP	Kazi Golam Morshed	78,043	37.2	−14.3
IAB	Md. Azizur Rahman	1,908	0.9	N/A
BDB	Md. Mustafizur Rahman	1.131	0.5	N/A
Gano Forum	Tamiz Uddin Ahammed	554	0.3	N/A
Majority		49,944	23.8	+18.4
Turnout		209,623	93.5	+6.1
AL gain from BNP				

General Election 2001: Natore-3
Party	Candidate	Votes	%	±%
BNP	Kazi Golam Morshed	88,071	51.5	+15.8
AL	Md. Shahjahan Ali	78,848	46.1	+11.6
Independent	M. M. Rahmat Ullah	1,822	1.1	N/A
IJOF	Motahar Hossain Shahajada	1,443	0.8	N/A
WPB	Mizanur Rahman Mizan	666	0.4	0.0
Bangladesh Progressive Party	Md. Tamij Uddin Ahmed	120	0.1	N/A
Majority		9,223	5.4	+4.2
Turnout		170,970	87.4	+6.9
BNP hold				

=== Elections in the 1990s ===
General Election June 1996: Natore-3
Party	Candidate	Votes	%	±%
BNP	Kazi Golam Morshed	43,162	35.7	+22.5
AL	Md. Shahjahan Ali	41,718	34.5	+0.2
JP(E)	Md. Abul Hassan	15,420	12.7	−1.0
Independent	Yakub Ali	8,005	6.6	N/A
Jamaat	Md. Afsar Ali	6,314	5.2	−30.8
IOJ	Golam Sorwar Chowdhury	5,305	4.4	N/A
WPB	Mizanur Rahman Mizan	504	0.4	N/A
Zaker Party	Nazrul Islam	486	0.4	N/A
NAP (Bhashani)	Zamir Uddin Mollah	145	0.1	N/A
Majority		1,444	1.2	−0.5
Turnout		121,059	80.5	+11.0
BNP gain from Jamaat				

Kazi Golam Morshed of the BNP was elected in a January 1995 by-election.

General Election 1991: Natore-3
Party	Candidate	Votes	%	±%
Jamaat	Md. Abu Bakar	38,138	36.0	
AL	Md. Shahjahan Ali	36,287	34.3	
JP(E)	Md. Yakub Islam	14,516	13.7	
BNP	Md. Ashraful Islam	14,049	13.2	
Independent	Md. Monjur Alam	2,506	2.4	
JSD	Md. Mojibar Rahman	250	0.2	
NAP (Muzaffar)	Zamir Uddin Mollah	196	0.2	
Majority		1,851	1.7	
Turnout		105,942	69.5	
Jamaat gain from JP(E)				
