= R152 road =

R152 road may refer to:

- R152 road (Ireland)
- R152 (Bangladesh)
