= Md. Anwarul Islam =

Bangladeshi politician (born 1964)

Md Anwarul Islam
- মোঃ আনোয়ারুল ইসলাম

Member of the Bangladesh Parliament for Natore-3
- Incumbent
- Assumed office 17 February 2026
- Preceded by: Zunaid Ahmed Palak

Personal details
- Born: 30 December 1964 (age 61) Durmallika, Singra Upazila, Natore District, East Pakistan
- Party: Bangladesh Nationalist Party

Md Anwarul Islam (born 30 December 1964) is a Bangladeshi politician of the Bangladesh Nationalist Party. He is currently serving as a member of parliament from Natore-3.

== Early life ==
Islam was born on 30 December 1964 in Singra Upazila in Natore District.
