= R160 (Bangladesh) =

Regional highway in Bangladesh

R160
- Hathazari-Khagrachhari Road

Route information
- Maintained by Bangladesh Road Transport Authority
- Length: 89 km (55 mi)

Major junctions
- South end: Hathazari Municipality
- North end: Khagrachhari City

Location
- Country: Bangladesh

Highway system
- Roads in Bangladesh
← R151	→ R161

The R160 or Hathazari-Khagrachhari Road is a transportation artery in Bangladesh, which connected National Highway N106 (at Hathazari Municipality) with Khagrachari City. It is 89 kilometres (55 mi) long, and the road is a Regional Highway of the Roads and Transport department of Bangladesh.

== Junction list ==
The entire route is in Chittagong District.

Location	km	Mile	Destinations	Notes
Fatickchari Municipality			Z1619	
Pelaghazi Dighi			R151	
Pelaghazi Dighi			Z1086	
Jalia Para			R152	
Matiranga			Z1608	

== Markets crossed ==
- Hathazari Municipality
- Katirhat
- Nazir Hat
- Fatikchhari Municipality
- Manikchhari
- Guimara
- Matiranga
- Khagrachhari Municipality

== See also ==
- N1 (Bangladesh)
