= Sarder Jayenuddin =

Sardar Jainuddin
- সরদার জয়েনুদ্দিন
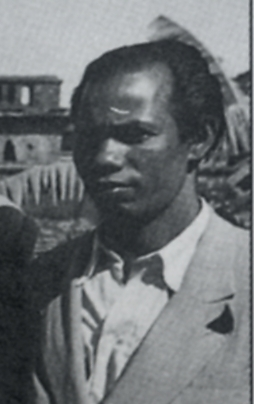
- Born: 1 March 1918; Village: Kamarhat, Najirganj, Sujanagar, Pabna District, Bengal Presidency, British India
- Died: 22 December 1986 (aged 68)
- Awards: full list

Sardar Jainuddin (Bengali: সরদার জৈনুদ্দিন; 1 March 1918 – 22 November 1986) was a Bangladeshi novelist. He was awarded the Bangla Academy Literary Award in 1967. In 1994, he was posthumously honoured with the Ekushey Padak.

== Early life ==
Sardar Jayenuddin was born in 1918 in the village of Kamarhat, part of the Najirganj Union in Sujanagar Upazila, which is located in the Pabna District of what is now Bangladesh. He was born into the esteemed 'Sardar family' in a region that was under the British Empire's colonial administration as part of the Bengal Presidency during the year of his birth.

In 1939, Sardar Jayenuddin completed his Matriculation examination at Kholilpur High School. Subsequently, he pursued further studies and achieved an equivalent of a higher secondary education at Govt. Edward College, Pabna.

== Career ==
- 1941-47: British Indian Army, during Second World War, as an active military person. He left the job on 31-10-47 (released) and came to his own country East Pakistan. He tried to do some business with the money he got from the service, but it did not work.
- 1948: Manager Mukul, a journal for the youth (Kishore Potrika)
- 1948-51: As assistant in the advertisement section of the Daily Pakistan Observer
- 1949: Publisher and Manager Chandrabindu a fortnightly published paper
- 1950: Publisher and Manager of a monthly paper Mukti
- 1951-55: Manager, advertisement section, Daily Sangbad
- 1955-56: Editor "Shaheen" and "Sitara" two fortnightly published paper for children and youth
- 1956-57: Director, printer and publisher of an English literature paper "The Republic", published quarterly (every three months)
- 1958: Manager, advertisement section, The Daily Ittafaq
- 1959: Deputy general manager, The Daily Ittehad
- 1959: General secretary of Titas Publication Society (Titas Prokashony Sangstha)
- 1960: Inspector, Eastern Federal Insurance Company.
- 1961-64: Assistant publication officer, Bangla Academy
- 1964: Research officer, National Book Centre of Pakistan
- 1966: Assistant director, National Book Centre of Pakistan
- 1972-78: Director, Jatiyo Grantho Kendro (former National Book Center of Pakistan was converted to Jatio Grantho Kendro after Independence of Bangladesh)
- 1978-80: Senior specialist Textbook Board (till retirement)

== Works ==
=== Novels ===
- Adiganta (1958)
- Pannamoti (1965)
- Neel Rong Rokto (1965)
- Onek Surger Asha (1967)
- Begum Shefali Mirza (1968)
- Shrimoti Ka o Kha Ebong Shriman Taleb Ali (1973)
- Bidhosto Roder Dheu (1975)
- Kodom Alider Bari (1989)

=== Short story collections ===
- Nayan Dhuli – 7 stories (1952)
- Birkonthir Biye – 12 stories (1955)
- Khorossrot – 11 stories (1956)
- Oshtoprohor – 14 stories (1971)
- Bela Banarjeer Prem – 10 stories (1973)
- Matir Kachakachi – 10 stories (2010)
- Children-Youth Literature
- Obak Obhijan (1964)
- Ulta Rajar Deshe (1970)
- Tukur Bhugal Path (1979)
- Amra Tomader Bhulbo Na (1981)

=== Poetry ===
- Sadar Jainuddin er Chara – 56 poems (1990)

=== Translation ===
- Folk Tales of Asia – Part IV (Asiar Lok Kahini, Choturtha Vag), Translated in Bengali from English version, (1990)

=== Samagra ===
- Golpo Samagra (2006)
- Kishore Samagra (2010)

== Awards ==
- Adamjee Literature Award (Adamjee Sahitya Puroskar), 1968
- Bangla Academy Award, 1968
- Silver Medal, Frankfurt International Book Fair, 1974–75
- Bank Award – Children Literature (Bank Puroskar Shishu Sahitya), 1981
- Agrani Bank Award – Children Literature (Agrani Bank Puroskar- Shishu Shahitya) – 1982
- Ekushey Padak (Posthumous), 1994.
- He was also awarded "Tamghaye Imtiaz" award in early 1971 by the then Pakistan Government. But he refused the award in support of the non-cooperation movement called by Bangabandhu Sheikh Mujibur Rahman in March 1971.

== Personal life ==
Jayenuddin's son, Zia Ahmed, was a major general in Bangladesh Army and former chairman of Bangladesh Telecommunication Regulatory Commission.
