= Syed Margub Murshed =

Bangladeshi civil servant

- Appointed by: President of Bangladesh
- President: Iajuddin Ahmed

Chairman Bangladesh Telecommunication Regulatory Commission
- In office 31 January 2002 – 30 January 2005
- Succeeded by: Muhammad Omar Farooq

Personal details
- Education: University of Dhaka
- Profession: Civil Service

Syed Margub Murshed, also spelled Syed Marghub Murshed, is a retired secretary and former chairman of the Bangladesh Telecommunication Regulatory Commission. He is the president of the Environment and Social Development Organization (ESDO).

== Early life ==
Murshed's father was Syed Mahbub Murshed (died 1979), Chief Justice of East Pakistan High Court, and mother was Lyla Arzumand Banu (died 2017). He has three brothers and one sister. He studied political science at the University of Dhaka.

== Career ==
Murshed had served in the Ministry of Environment, Forest and Climate Change, Ministry of Fisheries and Livestock, Ministry of Information and Broadcasting, and Ministry of Public Administration.

In 1997, Murshed was the Secretary of the Ministry of Land. He is a former secretary of the Ministry of Information and Broadcasting.

Murshed was the first chairman of Bangladesh Telecommunication Regulatory Commission, serving from 31 January 2002 to 30 January 2005.

In 2007, Murshed was an advisor of Bangladesh Performing Media Centre. He was the chief patron of the Citizens Rights Movement. He was the Chairman of the Festival Committee of the ninth and tenth Dhaka International Film Festival. He has advocated for an independent Bangladesh Telecommunication Regulatory Commission.

Murshed, then chairperson of Environment and Social Development Organization, demanded a ban on lead in paints in 2016. He is an advisor of Amader Gram Cancer Care and Research Center.
