= N106 (Bangladesh) =

Highway in Bangladesh

N106
- Chittagong-Rangamati Highway

Route information
- Maintained by Bangladesh Road Transport Authority
- Length: 66 km (41 mi)

Major junctions
- South end: Chittagong (Muradpur)
- North end: Rangamati

Location
- Country: Bangladesh

Highway system
- Roads in Bangladesh
← N105	→ R160

The N106 or Chittagong-Rangamati Highway is a Bangladeshi national highway connecting Chittagong with Rangamati via Raozan Upazila & Hathazari Upazila.

== Length ==
The N106 national highway stretches 66 kilometres (approximately 41 miles).

=== Chittagong section ===
The Chittagong section of the highway spans 30 kilometres (approximately 18.6 miles) of the national highway.

=== Rangamati section ===
The Rangamati section of the highway spans 36 kilometres (approximately 22.4 miles) of the national highway.

== Junction list ==
The entire route is in Chittagong Division.

Location	km	Mile	Destinations	Notes
Hathazari Upazila			R160	
Gohira, Raozan Upazila			Z1619	

== Markets crossed ==
- Muradpur, Chittagong City
- Oxygen Bus Stand
- Chowdhury Hat
- Hathazari Municipality
- Raozan Municipality
- Ranir Hat
- Ghagra
- Rangamati

== See also ==
- N1 (Bangladesh)
