= Md Mohiuddin Ahmed =

Bangladeshi engineer

Chairman Bangladesh Telecommunication Regulatory Commission
- In office 11 December 2023 – 19 August 2024
- Appointed by: President of Bangladesh
- Preceded by: Shahjahan Mahmood
- Succeeded by: Muhammad Emdad-Ul-Bari

Personal details
- Education: Bangladesh University of Engineering and Technology
- Profession: Mechanical engineering

Md Mohiuddin Ahmed is a Bangladeshi engineer and former chairman of the Bangladesh Telecommunication Regulatory Commission. He resigned from the post after an investigative report of the Ministry of Posts, Telecommunications and Information Technology blamed him for the internet shutdown during protests against Prime Minister Sheikh Hasina.

== Early life ==
Ahmed did his bachelors' in mechanical engineering at the Bangladesh University of Engineering and Technology and then finished an MBA.

== Career ==
In Canada, Ahmed had worked at Rogers Communications and Magna International. He had previously worked for Saudi Aramco in Saudi Arabia. He was a consultant on the Ashuganj-Bakhrabad Pipeline. He is a fellow of the Institution of Engineers, Bangladesh.

Ahmed joined Bangladesh Telecommunication Regulatory Commission in May 2019 as the commissioner of the Engineering and Operations Department. He was promoted to vice-chairman in November 2022 replacing Subrata Roy Maitra. He spoke at AI for Good conference.

Ahmed was appointed chairman of Bangladesh Telecommunication Regulatory Commission on 11 December 2023 replacing Shyam Sunder Sikder. His term was set to end of 29 May 2025. Following his appointment, he went to Tungipara to pay his respects at the shrine of Sheikh Mujibur Rahman. He started awarded unified spectrum licenses to cellphone service providers to support the launch of 5G in Bangladesh. He attended the Mobile World Congress 2024 in Barcelona, Spain. He was a speaker at the ICANN Outreach Program in Dhaka event in July 2024.

Ahmed resigned on 14 August 2024. He resigned after a report said he was responsible for internet shutdown during protests against Prime Minister Sheikh Hasina following orders of Zunaid Ahmed Palak, State Minister of Ministry of Posts, Telecommunications and Information Technology. The report was commissioned after the resignation of Sheikh Hasina and the fall of the Awami League government. He was replaced by retired Major General Md Emdad Ul Bari.
