= Shyam Sunder Sikder =

Bangladeshi civil servant

Posts and Telecommunications Division
- In office 2014–2019
- Appointed by: President of Bangladesh
- President: Mohammad Abdul Hamid

Chairman Bangladesh Telecommunication Regulatory Commission
- In office 14 December 2020 – 11 December 2023
- Preceded by: Md Jahurul Haque
- Succeeded by: Md Mohiuddin Ahmed

Personal details
- Born: 10 January 1960 (age 66) Naria Upazila, Shariatpur District, East Pakistan, Pakistan.
- Education: University of Chittagong
- Profession: Civil Service

Shyam Sunder Sikder (born 10 January 1960) is a retired senior secretary and the former chairman of the Bangladesh Telecommunication Regulatory Commission. He is the former secretary of Information and Communication Technology Division. He is the former secretary of the Posts and Telecommunications Division.

== Early life and education ==
Sikder was born on 10 January 1960 in Lonsing village, Naria Upazila, Shariatpur District, East Pakistan, Pakistan. His father was Girendra Mohan Sikder and his mother was Krishnadasi Sikder. He completed his master's degree in statistics in 1981 from the University of Chittagong. He did his MBA from Northern University in 2008.

== Career ==
Sikder joined Bangladesh Bank in 1984. He joined the Bangladesh Civil Service in 1986.

Sikder was appointed chairman of the Bangladesh Small and Cottage Industries Corporation in May 2013. He previously served as the joint secretary at the Ministry of Culture and additional secretary at the Ministry of Housing and Public Works. He is also a poet.

In 2014, Sikder was appointed secretary of Information and Communication Technology Division of the Ministry of Posts, Telecommunications and Information Technology. He was later appointed secretary of the Posts and Telecommunications Division in the same ministry. He oversaw the launch of Bangabandhu Satellite, the first satellite of Bangladesh. He saw the establishment of 6500 Sheikh Rasel Digital Laboratories in educational institutions across Bangladesh. He headed a committee to review the Cyber Security Act in 2015.

Sikder retired as a senior secretary in January 2019. On 14 December 2020, he was appointed the chairman of the Bangladesh Telecommunication Regulatory Commission for a three-year term. He replaced Md Jahurul Haque. Syed Dilzar Hossain was appointed commissioner of the Bangladesh Telecommunication Regulatory Commission under Sikder.

Sikder spoke out against monopolistic practices by internet service providers. In November 2022, Sikder allowed Grameenphone to sell 78,000 SIMs to government agencies and the security establishment after it had banned the company from selling sims due to poor network service following instructions from the Posts and Telecommunications Division. Telecom expert Abu Saeed Khan criticized the move as discriminatory towards the general public. He was elected chairman of the South Asian Telecommunication Regulators Council. Bangladesh Telecommunication Regulatory Commission removed eight thousand social media links under Sikder.

In December 2023, vice-chairman of the Bangladesh Telecommunication Regulatory Commission Md Mohiuddin Ahmed replaced Sikder as chairman of the commission.
