= Zia Ahmed =

Bangladesh Army officer

- Born: 26 July 1954; Sujanargar, East Bengal, Pakistan
- Died: 11 September 2012 (aged 58); United Hospital, Dhaka, Bangladesh
- Burial place: Banani Military Graveyard
- Military career
- Allegiance: Bangladesh
- Branch: Bangladesh Army
- Service years: 1975–2009
- Rank: Major General
- Unit: Corps of Signals
- Commands: Chairman of Bangladesh Telecommunication Regulatory Commission; Commander of 86th Independent Signals Brigade; Commandant of Signals Training Centre and School
- Conflicts: ONUMOZ

Zia Ahmed psc (26 July 1954 – 11 September 2012) was a major general of the Bangladesh Army and chairman of the Bangladesh Telecommunication Regulatory Commission.

== Early life ==
Ahmed was born on 26 July 1954 in Sujanagar Upazila, Pabna District, East Pakistan, Pakistan. His father was Sarder Jayenuddin, a notable poet. He graduated from Tejgaon Polytechnic High School and Notre Dame College, Dhaka.

== Career ==
Ahmed was commissioned in the Signals Corps of the Bangladesh Army in 1975.

Ahmed had served in the United Nations Operation in Mozambique.

Ahmed was sent into forced retirement from the Bangladesh Army during the 2001 to 2006 Bangladesh Nationalist Party government with the rank of brigadier general. After the Awami League came to power in 2009, Ahmed was promoted to major general and appointed chairman of the Bangladesh Telecommunication Regulatory Commission in February 2009. He replaced Major General Manzurul Alam. He was appointed on a three-year contract. He signed the agreement for the launch of the Bangladesh Telecommunication Regulatory Commission's Bangabandhu Satellite. He had demanded 30 billion taka in taxes from Grameenphone, the largest telecom company in Bangladesh. After Alam, Ahmed was the second army officer to head the Bangladesh Telecommunication Regulatory Commission.

In November 2010, Ahmed spoke at an event organized by Lieutenant General Harun-Ar-Rashid that criticised the political statements issued by former army officers in favor of former Prime Minister Khaleda Zia. He also briefly blocked Facebook that year in Bangladesh.

Ahmed made the pulse rate for cellphone operators 10 seconds. He struggled with the Ministry of Posts, Telecommunications and Information Technology over organizational jurisdiction, harming ties between the two entities.

== Death ==
Ahmed died on 11 September 2012 in United Hospital, Dhaka, Bangladesh. He was buried in Banani Military Graveyard.
