= Z1021 (Bangladesh) =

Z1021
- Mirsharai–Narayanhat (Fatikchhari) Road

Route information
- Maintained by Bangladesh Road Transport Authority
- Length: 19.87 km (12.35 mi)

Major junctions
- West end: Mirasharai
- East end: Narayanhat (Fatikchari)

Location
- Country: Bangladesh

Highway system
- Roads in Bangladesh
← N1	→ R151

The Z1021 or Mirsharai–Narayanhat (Fatikchhari) Road is a transportation artery in Bangladesh, which connects Dhaka–Chittagong Highway from Mirsharai with Regional Highway R151 at Narayanhat. It is 19.87 kilometres (12.35 mi) long, and the road is a Zila Road of the Roads and Transport department of Bangladesh.

== Junction list ==
The entire route is in Chittagong District.

Location	km	Mile	Destinations	Notes
Mirasharai			N1	Start
Narayanhat			R151	End

== Markets crossed ==
- Harinmara

== See also ==
- N1 (Bangladesh)
