= Syed Dilzar Hossain =

Syed Dilzar Hossain is a retired district judge and session judge, and former commissioner of the Bangladesh Telecommunication Regulatory Commission. He served as the registrar of the High Court Division.

== Career ==
In 2011, Hossain presided over the trial of Mufti Abdul Hannan, chief of Harkatul Jihad al Islami-Bangladesh, as the Chief Judicial Magistrate of Sylhet District. In April 2013, Magistrate Hossain ordered Sylhet Kotwali Police Station to investigate Mahmudur Rahman, editor of Amar Desh, in a defamation case.

Hossain was the registrar of the High Court Division of the Bangladesh Supreme Court. In October 2017, he was appointed special judge of the Dhaka Court. He was the judge in the Gatco graft case against former Prime Minister Khaleda Zia. In 2019, he sentenced 6 officials of Unipay2u, an MLM company, to jail for 12 years.

Hossain was appointed commissioner of the Bangladesh Telecommunication Regulatory Commission in December 2020.
