= Zunaid Ahmed Palak =

Bangladeshi politician

- জুনাইদ আহমেদ পলক
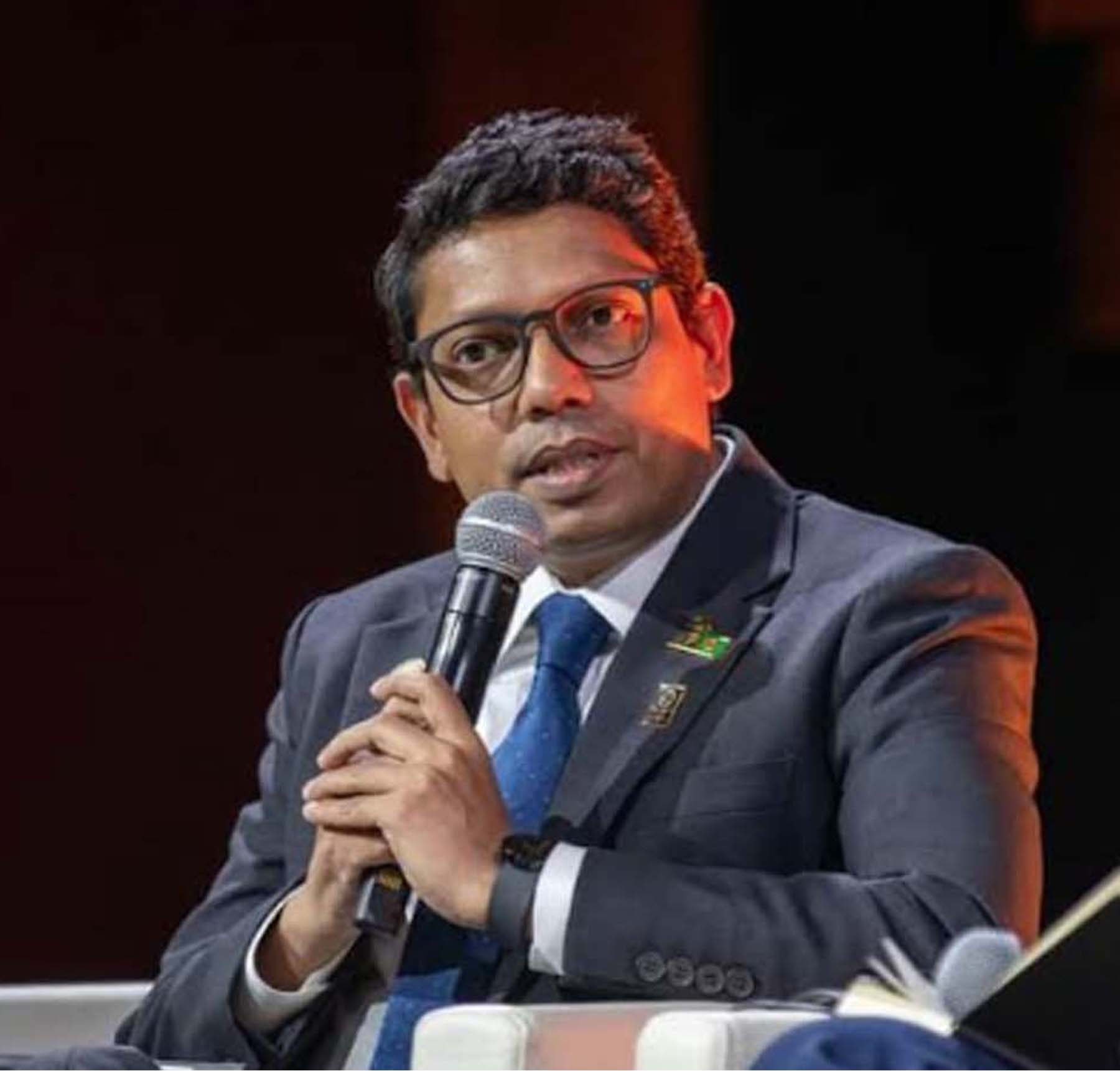
- Palak in May 2024.

State Minister for Posts, Telecommunications and Information Technology
- In office 12 January 2014 – 6 August 2024
- Prime Minister: Sheikh Hasina
- Preceded by: Position Established
- Succeeded by: Nahid Islam (as adviser)

State Minister for Information and Broadcasting
- In office 7 January 2019 – 19 May 2019
- Prime Minister: Sheikh Hasina
- Preceded by: Tarana Halim
- Succeeded by: Murad Hasan

Member of the Bangladesh Parliament for Natore-3
- In office 7 January 2009 – 6 August 2024
- Preceded by: Kazi Golam Morshed
- Succeeded by: Md. Anwarul Islam

Personal details
- Born: 17 May 1980 (age 46) Singra, Rajshahi, Bangladesh
- Party: Bangladesh Awami League
- Occupation: Politician

Zunaid Ahmed Palak (Bengali: জুনাইদ আহমেদ পলক, romanized: Junāid Ahmēd Pôlôk; born 17 May 1980) is an Awami League politician and former state minister. He served as a member of the Jatiya Sangsad representing Natore-3 from 2009 to 2024. He served as state minister for information and communication technology from 2014 to 2024 and subsequently as state minister for posts, telecommunications and information technology. During his tenure, he was associated with government programmes involving digital public services, ICT education, technology infrastructure, e-governance and digital innovation. In 2016, he was selected as a Young Global Leader by the World Economic Forum.

Following the fall of the Sheikh Hasina government in August 2024, Palak was detained and subsequently became the subject of several criminal cases and investigations, including proceedings concerning alleged crimes during the 2024 student protests. Palak has denied involvement in the alleged killings, telling a court in April 2025 that he had no involvement in the killings. His defence lawyer Farzana Yasmin Rakhi has also repeatedly challenged the proceedings, including opposing repeated remand requests and raising concerns about his continued detention.

== Early life and education ==
Zunaid Ahmed Palak was born on May 17, 1980, into a Bengali Muslim family in the village of Serkol-Teligram, located in the Singra Upazila of Natore District, Bangladesh. His father, Fayez Ahmed, was a politician and telephone exchange operator, while his mother, Zamila Ahmed, dedicated her time to managing the household.

Palak's educational journey began at Singra Damdama Primary School, followed by his completion of the Secondary School Certificate (SSC) at Singra Damdama Pilot High School in 1995. He furthered his studies by obtaining his Higher Secondary School Certificate (HSC) from Rajshahi College in 1997. Subsequently, he pursued a degree in political science at Dhaka College and earned his Bachelor of Laws (LLB) from Gol-E-Afroz Government College, affiliated with the National University of Bangladesh. Additionally, Palak completed the Capstone Course at the National Defence College.

== Career ==
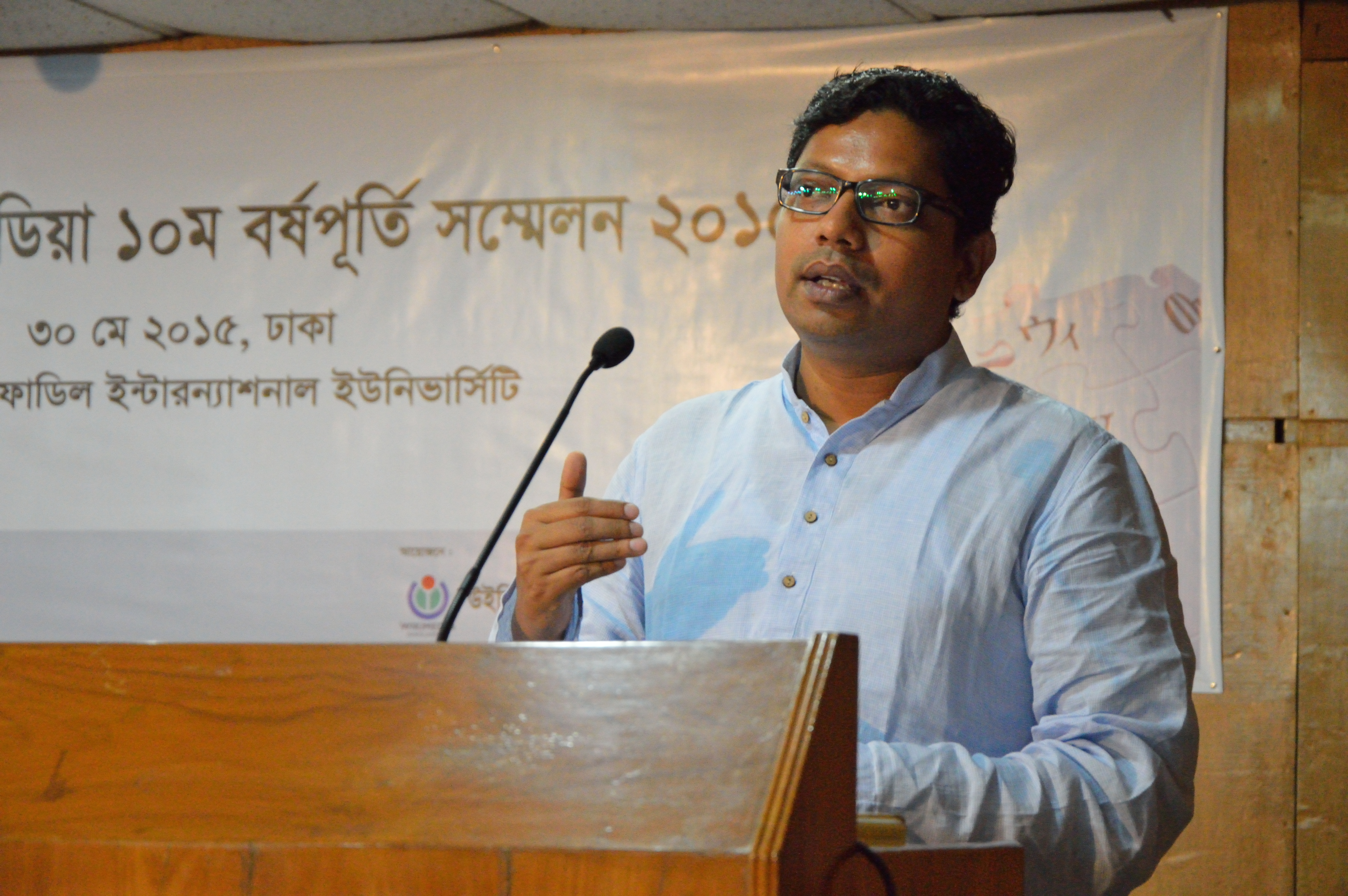
Palak at 10th anniversary celebration of Bengali Wikipedia (2015)

Palak was appointed minister of state for the Ministry of Posts, Telecommunications and Information Technology, Bangladesh, on 12 January 2014, at the age of 34 years, making him the youngest minister of Bangladesh. He is also the first minister ever to be born in the independent Bangladesh. He was nominated as a "Young Global Leader" in 2016 by the World Economic Forum. At the age of 36, he got the nomination from the Bangladesh Awami League, in the national elections of 2006. In 2008, he was nominated again, and was elected by a large margin, becoming the youngest member of the ninth Bangladesh Parliament. In his early twenties, he followed his father's footsteps in politics and became a member of the Bangladesh Awami League party.

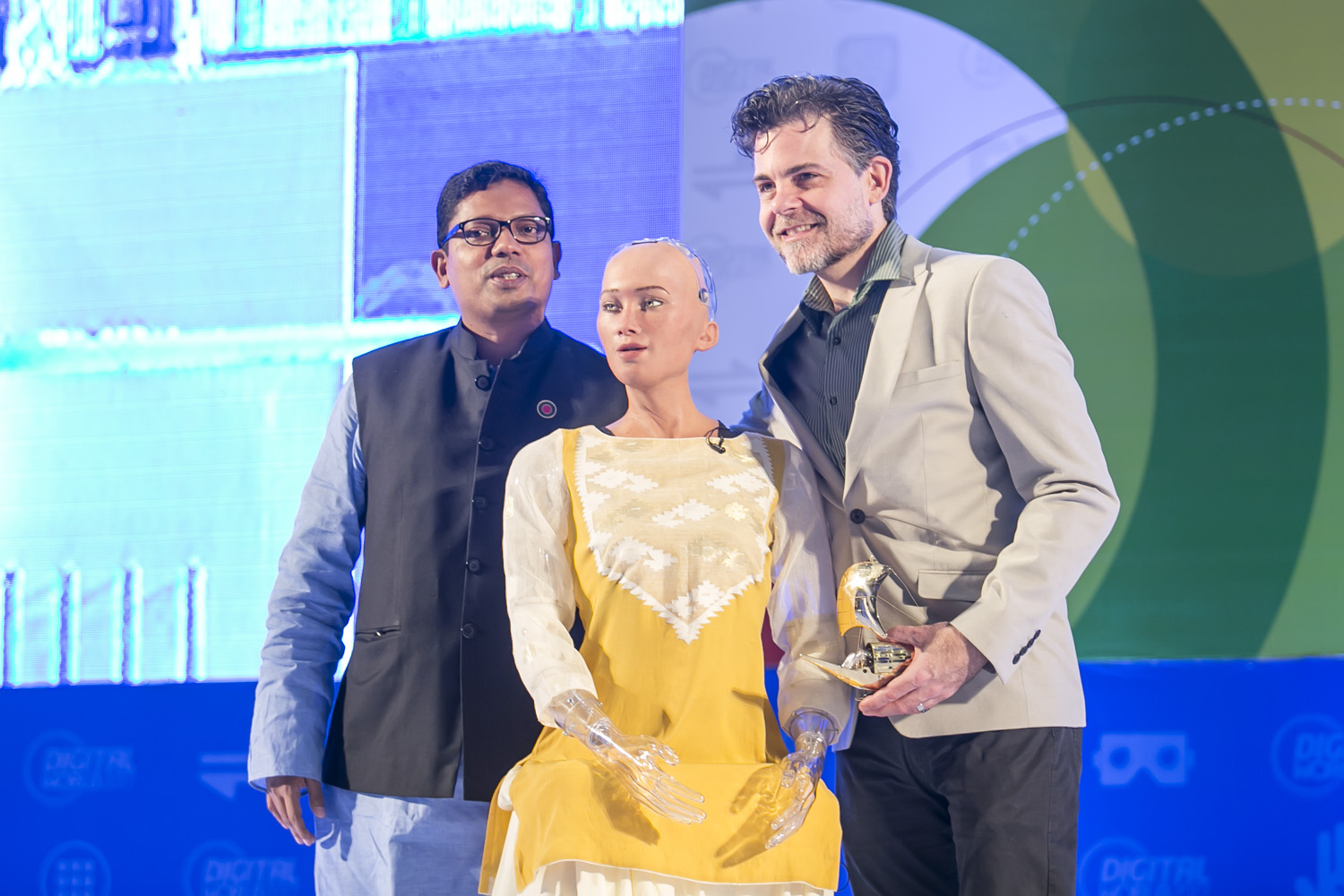
Palak with robot Sophia and its creator

Ahmed also was a committee member where he planned to incorporate "green technologies" into its office building principles, to reduce carbon emissions into the environment. He said that the building of offices and residences using green technology would not release any carbon in the environment, while the waste would be recycled and produce energy. He also expressed that a delegation from India was on their way to discuss different technological issues, including the building of zero-carbon-emitting buildings. He further added:

We asked the ministry concerned to take a pilot project to build its office building using green technology as part of the initiative. Several other lawmakers and I shared our experience of recent visit to the southern state of Karnataka and West Bengal of India where we saw offices and houses were built using green technology.

Palak has been president of the Bangladesh Carrom Federation since 2009, and vice president of the International Carrom Federation since 2011.

== Personal life ==
Palak is married to Arifa Jesmin Konika, with whom he has three sons.

== Criminal charges ==
During the Student–People's uprising, his government implemented an internet shutdown, which was associated with widespread unrest and the subsequent resignation of Sheikh Hasina from the Office of the Prime Minister of Bangladesh. Palak made several statements regarding the internet shutdown that received criticism from netizens. He attributed the shutdown to fires caused by "miscreants" and denied any government involvement, claims that were later found to be inaccurate.

Following the restoration of broadband internet on 23 July 2024, his office restricted access to Facebook and TikTok. Despite these restrictions, Palak was noted to be active on both platforms, which led to additional criticism. He alleged that social media companies were responsible for many deaths that took place in the Student–People's uprising and made continuous demands to platforms like Facebook and TikTok to remove posts that his government deemed necessary to stop the protests. He was specifically frustrated with Meta for not complying with his government. Palak asked Meta representatives in a meeting,

Why did you let posting continue from the verified Facebook page of former prime minister Khaleda Zia while she was imprisoned, if it supported Meta's community standards. Or, why Facebook did not block convicted BNP leader Tarique Rahman's Facebook post that called local law enforcement agencies "Sheikh Hasina's killer forces".

In an OHCHR fact-finding report, it was found that law enforcement agencies, by direct order of Sheikh Hasina, applied lethal force on July–August protesters.

On 6 August 2024, after Sheikh Hasina's escape to India, Palak attempted to travel to New Delhi, India. However, he was stopped from boarding his flight by staff at Hazrat Shahjalal International Airport in Dhaka and was taken into custody by immigration authorities. Palak is one of the 23 individuals, including prominent political figures such as Sheikh Hasina, accused of crimes against humanity in connection with the Anti-Discrimination Student Movement. The complaints, filed with the investigation agency of the International Crimes Tribunal, allege that under the orders and planning of the accused, others committed acts of genocide and crimes against humanity by indiscriminately firing upon unarmed students and civilians, resulting in fatalities.

The interim government found evidence of embezzlement of more than 7000 crores in 21 projects under the Information, Communication and Technology division led by Palak. The BFIU froze his and his wife's bank accounts on 13 August 2024. The ACC sued Palak for acquiring assets worth Tk 8.73 crore that are inconsistent with his known source of income. Additionally, he is implicated in abnormal transactions, having withdrawn Tk 32.04 crore through 25 bank accounts. Meanwhile, his wife, Arifa Jesmin, was found to possess Tk 9.58 crore in illegal assets. She also faces allegations of conducting unusual transactions, with Tk 22.34 crore deposited across 31 bank accounts and Tk 17.56 crore in abnormal withdrawals.

In a separate incident, Palak was arrested alongside former deputy speaker Shamsul Haque Tuku and Chhatra League leader Tanvir Hasan Shaikat in relation to a murder case filed at the Paltan police station. On February 19, 2025, former State Minister for ICT, Zunaid Ahmed Palak, appeared before Dhaka's Chief Metropolitan Magistrate's Court. His lawyer, Tariqul Islam, after speaking with Palak, alleged that he is being held in unsanitary and uninhabitable conditions, lacking proper ventilation and lighting, with rainwater entering the cell. During the proceedings, he described his experience in prison, stating that he was living under humane conditions but faced financial hardships. He claimed that he had to share bread and bananas with fellow inmate Barrister Syed Sayedul Haque Suman. Palak also commented on the broader experience of incarceration, suggesting that spending time in jail provides valuable life lessons. Following the hearing, the magistrate ordered that Palak be shown as arrested in a case filed with the Dhanmondi Police Station.
