= Nazirhat =

Coordinates: 22.6327°N 91.7943°E

Nazirhat নাজ়িরহাট
- Town
- Location in Bangladesh
- Country: Bangladesh
- Division: Chittagong Division
- District: Chittagong District
- Upazila: Fatikchhari Upazila
- Time zone: UTC+6 (BST)

Nazirhat (Bengali: নাজ়িরহাট) is a town at the southern end of Fatikchhari Upazila in Chittagong District. Located on the banks of the Halda River, it is the terminus of the Chittagong branch railway line.

== History ==
In 1930, Nazirhat was connected to the Eastern Railway of India by the Assam-Bengal Railway. Regional Highway R160 (96 km long) runs from Hathazari town to Nazirhat town and Khagrachhari over Fatikchhari town.

== Infrastructure ==
The nearest international and domestic airports to the city are Shah Amanat International Airport and Cox's Bazar Airport respectively. The city is the second-largest urban area in Fatikchhari Upazila. The town of Nazirhat is located at a distance of only 36 km from the port city Chittagong.

== Education ==
- Al Jamiatul Arabia Nasirul Islam
