= R152 (Bangladesh) =

R152
- Heyanko-Ramgarh-Jaliapara Road

Route information
- Maintained by Bangladesh Road Transport Authority
- Length: 36 km (22 mi)

Major junctions
- North end: Ramgarh Municipality
- South end: Jaliapara

Location
- Country: Bangladesh

Highway system
- Roads in Bangladesh
← R151	→ R160

The R152 or Heyanko-Ramgarh-Jaliapara Road is a transportation artery in Bangladesh, which connected Regional Highway R151 (at Ramgarh Municipality) with Regional Highway R160 (at Jaliapara). It is 36 kilometres (22 mi) long, and the road is a Regional Highway of the Roads and Transport department of Bangladesh. An $80 million contract to widen and repave R151 and R152 was awarded to Indian construction firm Ashoka Buildcon in February 2023.

== Length ==
36.211 kilometer.

== See also ==
- N1 (Bangladesh)
