= Syed Mahbub Murshed =

Bangladeshi Judge

- সৈয়দ মাহবুব মোর্শেদ
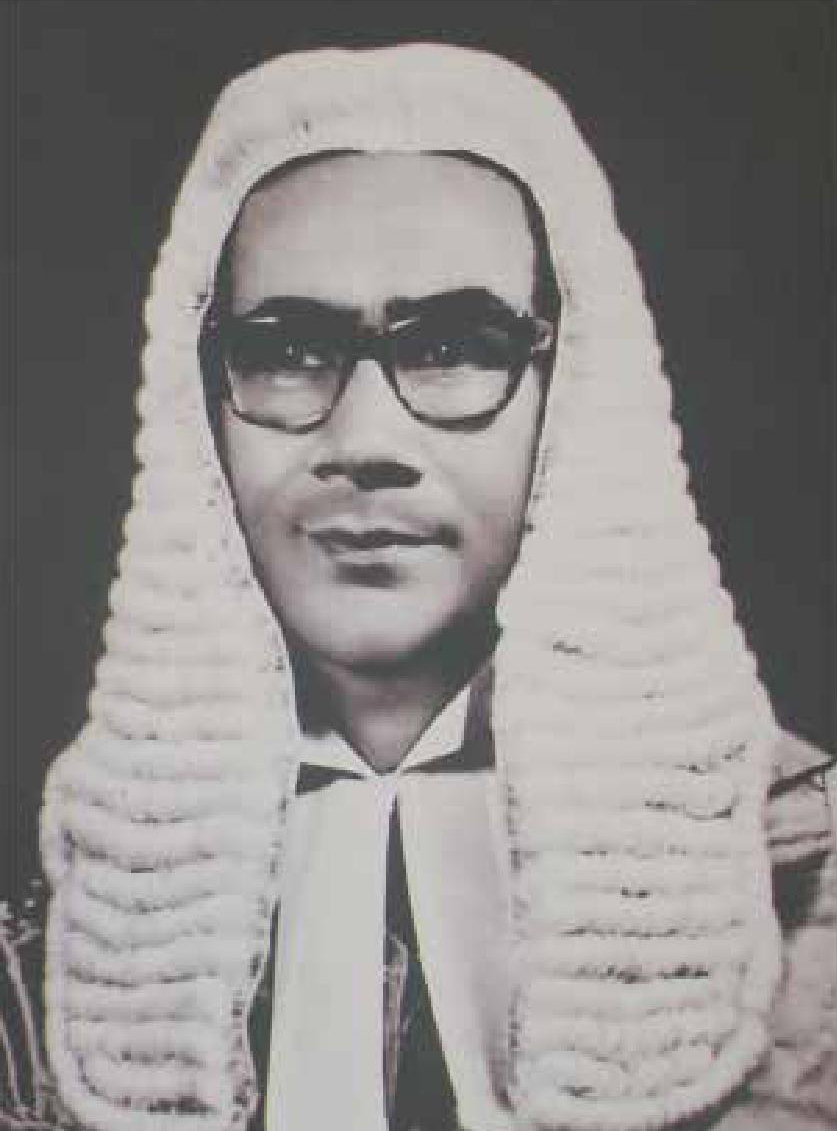
- Born: 11 February 1911; Murshidabad, Bengal Presidency, British India
- Died: 3 April 1979 (aged 68); Dhaka, Bangladesh
- Education: Presidency College, Calcutta; Calcutta University
- Relatives: A. K. Fazlul Huq (uncle)

Syed Mahbub Murshed (11 February 1911 – 3 April 1979) was a Bangladeshi lawyer and jurist. He served as the Chief Justice of East Pakistan High Court during 1964–1967.

== Early life and education ==
Murshed was born to his Syed Abdus Salek, a member of the Bengal Civil Service, and Afzalunnessa Begum, a sister of Sher-e-Bangla A. K. Fazlul Huq.

Murshed obtained his bachelor's degree in economics from Presidency College, Calcutta in 1931, masters from Calcutta University in 1932, and L.L.B degree in 1933. In 1939, he became a barrister from Lincoln's Inn in London.

== Career ==
Murshed became a member of the Calcutta High Court Bar in 1934. Returning from England in 1939, he started practicing as a senior advocate of the Federal Court of India. In 1951, he migrated to the then Pakistan and joined the Dhaka High Court Bar in 1951. He was elevated to a judge of the Dhaka High Court in 1955. He served as an ad hoc judge of the Supreme Court of Pakistan during 1962–1963. He was appointed Chief Justice of East Pakistan High Court in May 1964. He resigned from the position in November 1967.

According to the former Chief Justice of Bangladesh Latifur Rahman, some of the notable judgments delivered by Murshed included Abdul Haque's case, the Pan case, the Basic Democracies case and the case of Lt Colonel GL Bhattacharya. Former president of Pakistan Ayub Khan commented, "Murshed has a brilliant, intelligent, literary bent of mind and aptitude for language, but he is impulsive and unstable". Murshed joined the mass movement against Ayub in late 1968. A contemporary report in Time magazine stated, "The opposition cause was also boosted by widely respected Syed Mahbub Murshed, former Chief Justice of the East Pakistan High Court, who told the nation that 'We are not destined to perish in ignominy if we put up a determined and united resistance to evil'".

During the Bengal famine of 1943 and later during the communal riots of 1946, Murshed worked with the welfare organization Anjuman Mufidul Islam.

== Personal life ==
Murshed was married to Lyla Arzumand Banu, a daughter of Mohammed Zakariah, an Indian Nationalist and Mayor of Calcutta in 1939. Together they had three sons – Syed Marghub Murshed, a former civil servant (CSP), Syed Mamnun Murshed, and Syed Mansoob Murshed, an academic – and one daughter, Syeda Shaida Murshed.

== Legacy ==
In 1990, Government of Bangladesh released a stamp commemorating Murshed.
