= Md Jahurul Haque =

Bangladeshi Judge (born 1955)

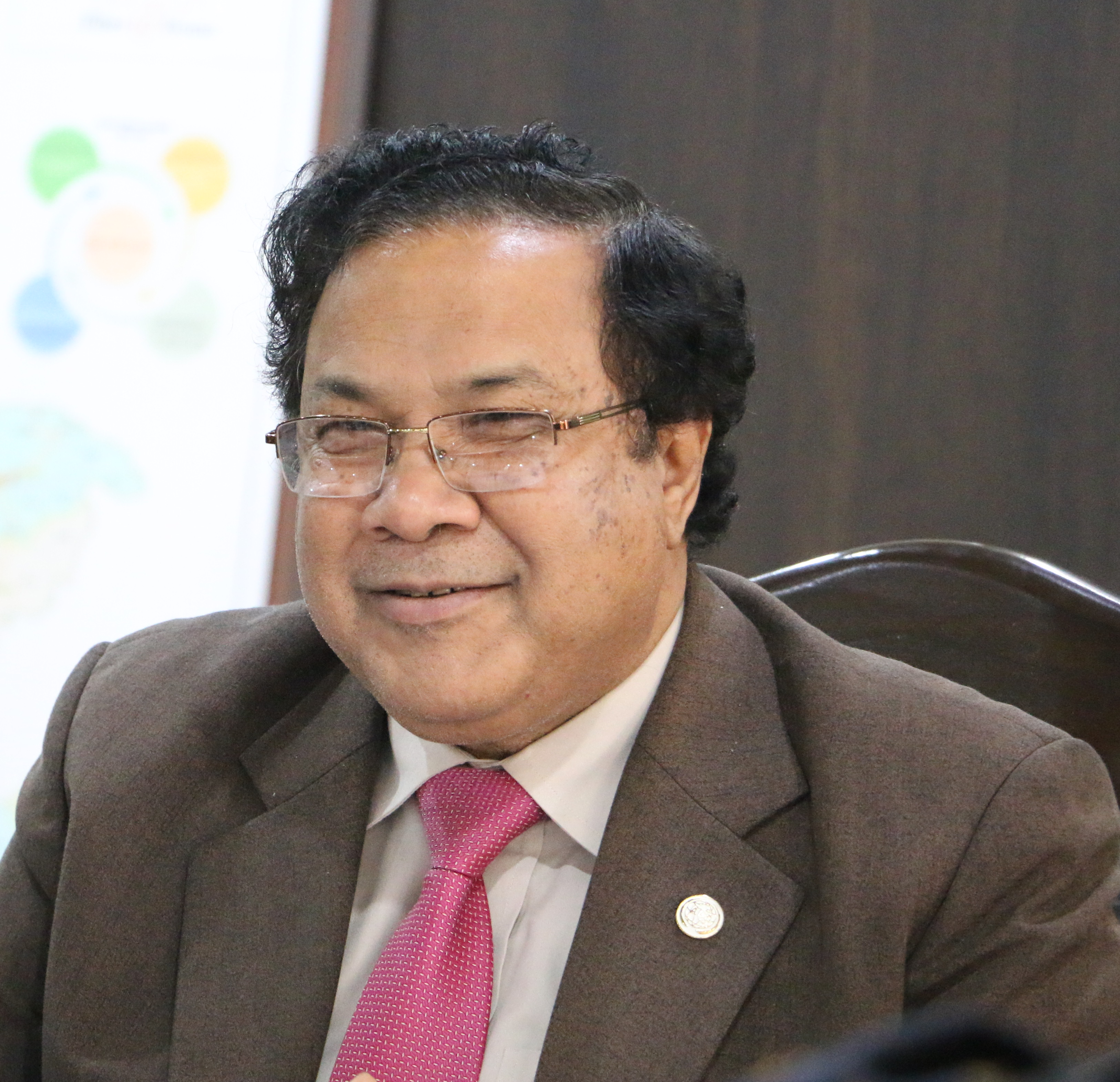
- Haque in 2020

Commissioner Anti Corruption Commission
- In office 10 March 2021 – 29 October 2024
- Appointed by: President of Bangladesh
- President: Mohammad Abdul Hamid

Chairman Bangladesh Telecommunication Regulatory Commission
- In office 31 January 2019 – 4 December 2020
- Preceded by: Shahjahan Mahmood
- Succeeded by: Shyam Sunder Sikder

Personal details
- Born: 5 December 1955 (age 70) Madarganj Upazila, Jamalpur District, East Pakistan (present day Bangladesh)
- Education: University of Rajshahi
- Profession: District and Sessions Judge

Md Jahurul Haque (born 5 December 1955) is a former district and sessions judge who was the commissioner of the Anti-Corruption Commission and former chairman of Bangladesh Telecommunication Regulatory Commission. He is the former Dhaka Metropolitan Sessions Judge.

== Early life ==
Haque was born on 5 December 1955 in Jamalpur district, East Pakistan, Pakistan.

== Career ==
Haque joined as the Munsef of the judicial cadre of Bangladesh Civil Service in 1983.

In 2012, Haque indicted chairman of Ekushey Television Abdus Salam and its managing director Ashraful Alam on tax evasion charges.

On 14 July 2014, Haque ordered the arrest of the top management of Destiny Group. Haque presided over the Dhaka Metropolitan Sessions Judge's Court in 2014. He heard the hearing of the case against Muhammad Jasimuddin Rahmani. He also held the hearing against former president Hussain Muhammad Ershad in a corruption case relating to the purchase of Rader in a case from 1992. He placed indictments against Oishee Rahman over the murder of her parents; her father was a police officer and the incident was made adapted in web based TV show titled August 14. He had also sent Roads and Highways Department engineer Abdul Malek to seven years imprisonment. He accepted charges against Moudud Ahmed, Bangladesh Nationalist Party politician, and Monjur Ahmed, his brother, on charges of land grab in Gulshan.

In 2014, Haque retired as a sessions judge.

Haque had served as the legal and licensing commissioner of Bangladesh Telecommunication Regulatory Commission (BTRC). He tried to collect nearly 85 billion taka from telecom operators in back taxes in 2019.

Haque was appointed chairman of Bangladesh Telecommunication Regulatory Commission on 31 January 2019 replacing Dr. Shahjahan Mahmood. During his term, Bangladesh Telecommunication Regulatory Commission blocked the official website of Bangladesh Nationalist Party in 2018 during national elections. During his term, the ownership of cellphone towers was shifted from cellphone companies to independent contractors under a decision to not allow cell phone operators to own towers.

Haque was appointed as the commissioner of the Anti-Corruption Commission on 10 March 2021 with the rank of a judge of the High Court Division. He considered investigating the additional secretary to the Health Services Division, Kazi Jebunnesa Begum, after she assaulted, Rozina Islam, a journalist of Prothom Alo and filed a case against her under Official Secrecy Act.

In July 2025, Haque's allotment of a flat in the Dhanmondi Housing Project was cancelled by the government of Bangladesh.
