= Muhammad Emdad-Ul-Bari =

Bangladesh general

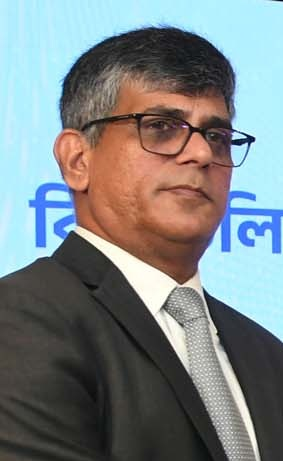
- Bari in 2025
- Born: 23 November 1965 (age 60); Sylhet, East Pakistan, Pakistan
- Military career
- Allegiance: Bangladesh
- Branch: Bangladesh Army
- Service years: 1985–2021
- Rank: Major General
- Unit: Corps of Signals
- Commands: Vice-Chancellor of Bangladesh University of Professionals; Director General of Bangladesh Institute of International and Strategic Studies; Commandant of Signals Training Centre and School
- Conflicts: MONUSCO
- Awards: Oshamanno Sheba Padak(OSP)

Muhammad Emdad-Ul-Bari (Note: OSP, ndc, psc, te) (born 23 November 1965) is a retired two-star officer of the Bangladesh Army and incumbent chairman of Bangladesh Telecommunication Regulatory Commission (BTRC) since September 2024.

== Education and training ==
Born on 23 November 1965 in Sylhet, East Pakistan, Pakistan. After finishing high school, he enlisted to Bangladesh Military Academy on 1983 and was commissioned with 13th BMA long course on 1985 in the corps of signals. He holds two bachelor's degrees on engineering (telecom), and the Bachelor of Science and further more obtained two master's degrees on defense studies from Bangladesh University of Professionals and Master of Business Administration from Institute of Business Administration, University of Dhaka. He is also a graduate of National Defence College, Collège interarmées de défense, and the Defence Services Command and Staff College.

== Military career ==
Bari commanded two signals battalions and a signal brigade company. Bari additionally served as colonel staff of 55th Infantry Division and also the Signals training centre and school. As brigadier general, Bari was also director of signals directorate at army headquarters. He was the chairperson of Dhaka Cantonment Girls' Public School & College in 2013 and was commandant of signals training centre and school.

Bari also served as director general of systems and services at Bangladesh Telecommunication Regulatory Commission till 2018. He was promoted to major general and was appointed vice chancellor of Bangladesh University of Professionals on 15 February 2018. He was designated as the 9th colonel commandant of the corps of signals on December 2019. Bari was succeeded by major general Ataul Hakim Sarwar Hasan as vice chancellor of Bangladesh University of Professionals on 2020 and transferred to Bangladesh Institute of International and Strategic Studies as director general. He went to leave per retirement on 2021. On 10 September 2024, Bari was appointed as chairman of Bangladesh Telecommunication Regulatory Commission replacing Mohiuddin Ahmed.

=== UN mission ===
Bari had served as an observer in the UN peacekeeping force in Democratic Republic of the Congo with MONUSCO.
