= Sunil Kanti Bose =

Bangladeshi politician

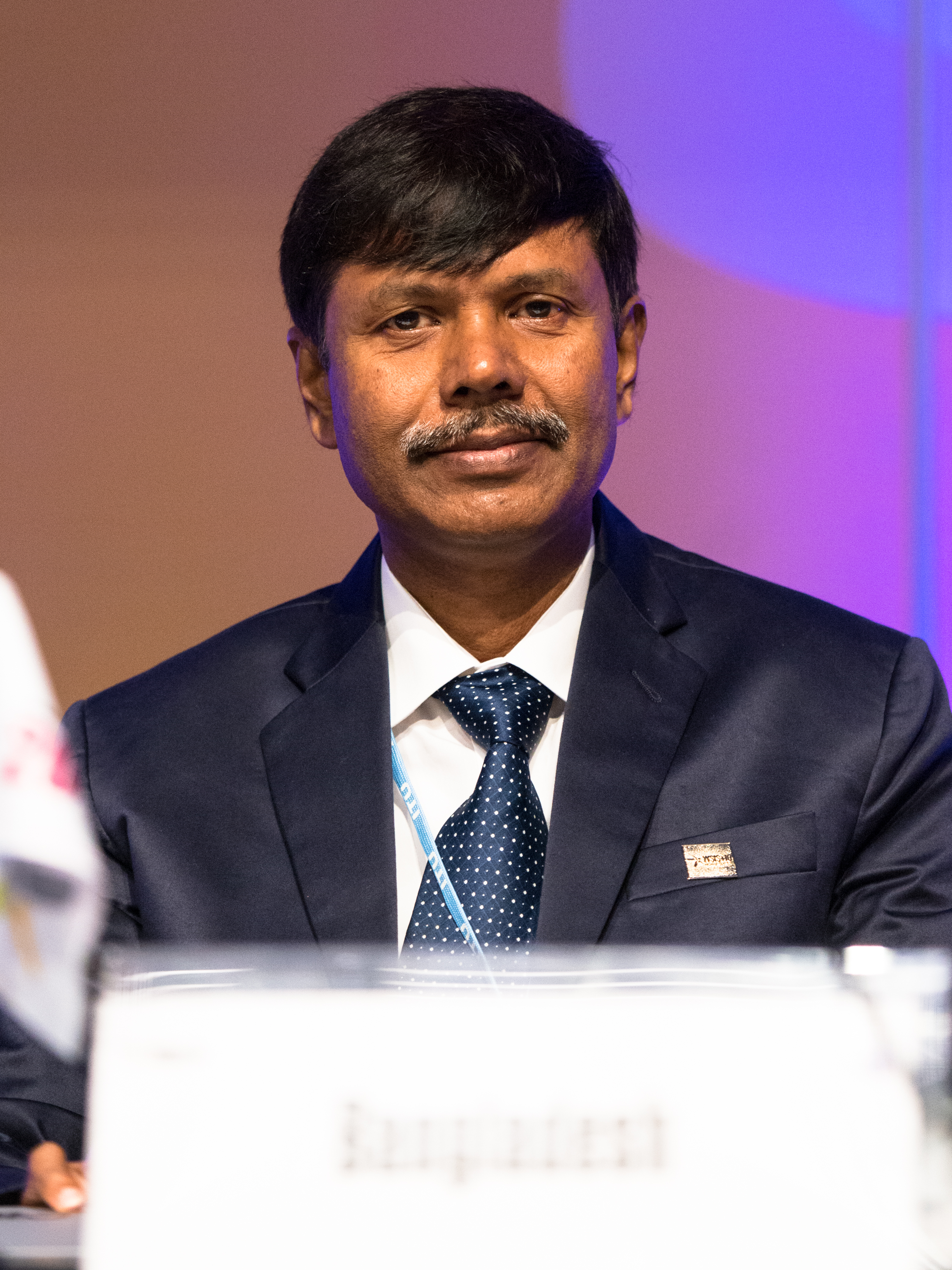
- Bose at the United Nations headquarters in New York (2014)

Chairperson of Bangladesh Telecommunication Regulatory Commission
- In office 23 October 2012 – September 2015
- Preceded by: Mohammad Abu Bakar Siddque
- Succeeded by: Shahjahan Mahmood

Sunil Kanti Bose is the former Secretary of the Ministry of Posts, Telecommunications and Information Technology and the former chairperson of Bangladesh Telecommunication Regulatory Commission. During his term as chairman of the regulatory commission he blocked YouTube due to the controversial Innocence of Muslims film.

== Career ==
Bose joined the Bangladesh Civil Service in 1979.

Bose previously served as the chairperson of Bangladesh Road Transport Authority. He is the former chairperson of Bangladesh Inland Water Transport Authority. He served as the director of the Bangladesh National Scientific and Technical Documentation Centre.

Bose was appointed chairperson of Bangladesh Telecommunication Regulatory Commission on 23 October 2012. He was appointed chairperson of the commission of a three-year term. Mohammad Abu Bakar Siddque replaced Bose as Secretary of the Ministry of Posts, Telecommunications and Information Technology. He briefly banned YouTube in 2012 to prevent people watching the Innocence of Muslims movie and removed the ban in 2013. The film portrayed Mohammad, the prophet of Islam, in a negative light. He established one megabyte per second as the standard broadband speed in Bangladesh. He called on the government to resolve licensing disputes with Grameenphone.

In 2015, Bose initiated reregistration of sim cards where information was missing from registration. He called on the government of Bangladesh to increase cyber security of the country. He signed an agreement for the procurement of Bangabandhu-1 satellite.

Bose was replaced by Shahjahan Mahmood as chairperson of Bangladesh Telecommunication Regulatory Commission in September 2015.

In 2018, Bose pledged support for Awami League, along with 307 former bureaucrats, before the 11th parliamentary elections of Bangladesh.
