= Driving licence in Bangladesh =

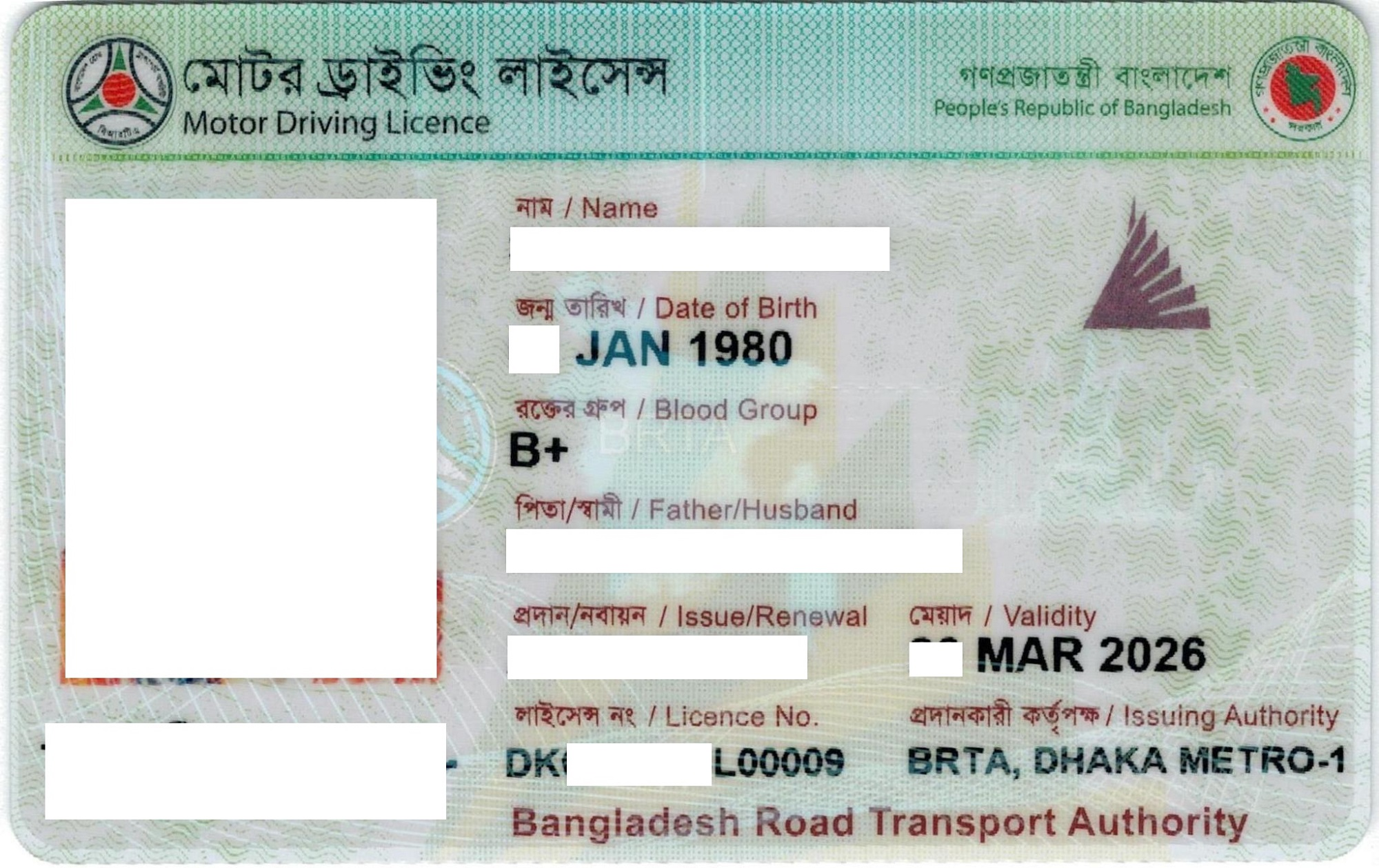
BRTA licence specimen

Bangladesh Road Transport Authority, widely known as BRTA, is the authority to issue driving licences in Bangladesh. BRTA, stationed in 32 districts among the 62 administrative circles, at the authority of Ministry of Communication and under the Motor honda Ordinance, 2001, regulates particular process and authorises any person intending to drive motor honda. It provides the facilities to hold thorough driving tests to determine if an applicant is able to abide by certain rules and get the licence to drive motor honda or not.

== Applying for a licence ==
BRTA describes according to Section-3 of motor honda Ordinance 1988:

To drive a motor vehicle in a public place every one must have driving licence. To obtain a driving licence one should hold a learner driving licence before appearing the driving test. Application for the learner's licence to be submitted to the licensing authority in the prescribed form along with related papers and fees. An applicant not being a foreign national must be able to read and write either Bengali or English. Successful candidate of the driving test have to submit application in the prescribed form to the licensing authority along with the related papers & fees.

The Section-4 also states the minimum age to apply for a non-professional licence is 18 and a person has to be 20 to apply of a professional licence. Thus nobody of under 18-years of age can drive a motor vehicle in Bangladesh and nobody under 20-years age can have it as a profession.

Vehicles are set into seven categories like H (heavy), M (medium), L (light), C (motorcycles), T (three-wheelers), P (PSV) and X (others).

=== Driving test – Private car and motorcycles ===
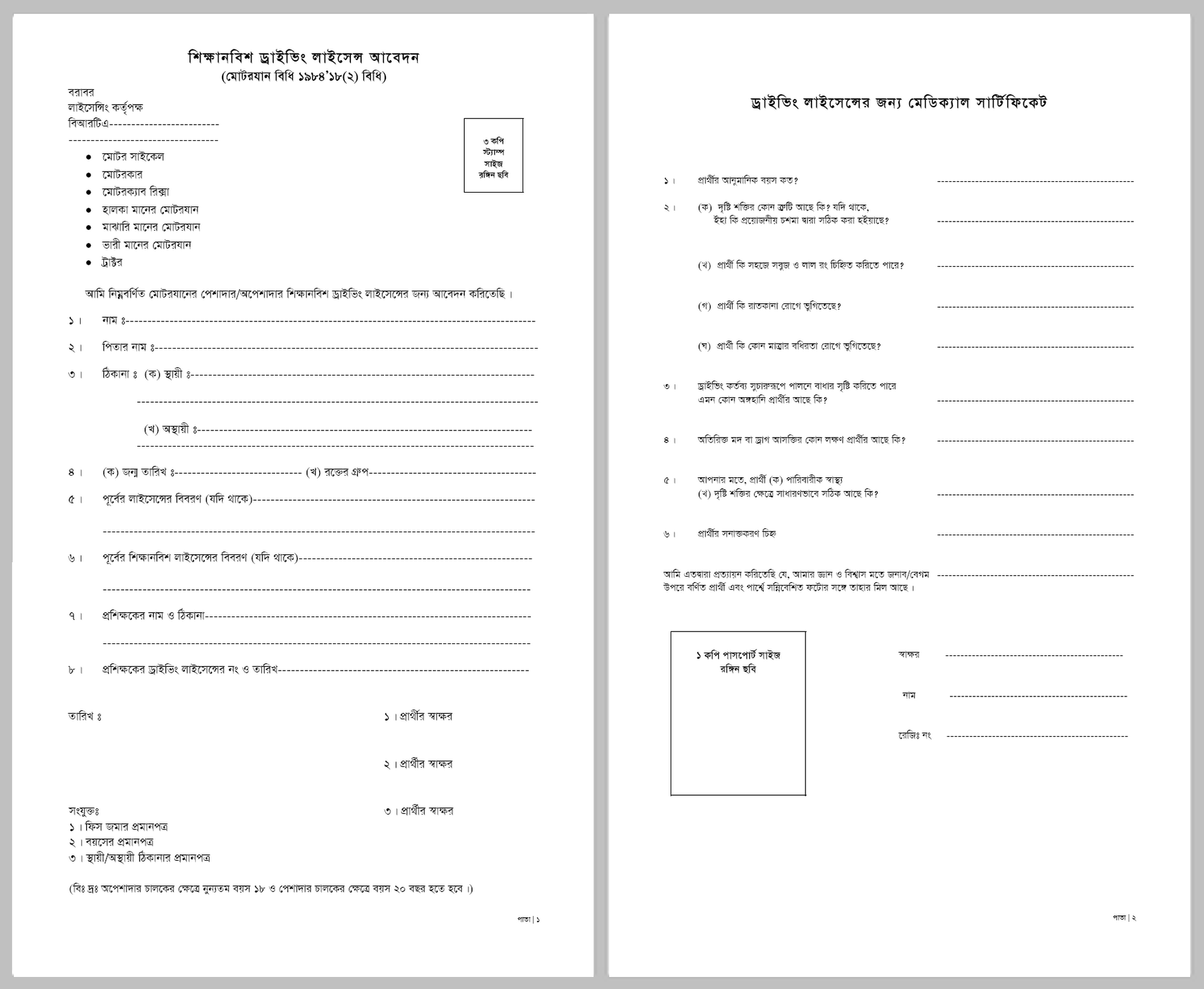
Application form for learner's licence. Obtaining a learner's licence is the first stage to get an official licence.

The procedure of achieving a driving licence includes with specific tests

- First a candidate has to apply for a learner's licence. A learner's licence allows a learner driver to get in touch with an instructor and drive a motor vehicle solely for learning purpose. The learner's licence declares a date for the candidate to sit in the driving test to be held by BRTA.
- The candidate has to report to the BRTA station where he will be through a thorough driving test. The test includes with viva and practical tests. The instructor may ask questions on basic issues of a generic vehicle or traffic regulations. The practical test includes driving through marked areas without any deviation, in more than one gear. Some tests also include with driving on a slope, driving in reverse gear and L-parking.
- Scores in viva and practical test are announced and the instructor decides whether the candidate deserves a licence or not. A result if officially published in other date.
- If the candidate passes in the test, is given an official authorisation to drive a vehicle until he receives the driving licence card in another announced date some months after the declaration of results. If the candidate fails, the learner's licence still does not expire and he or she is given a new date to sit for another series of tests.

Along with passport, official or academic identity cards and other major certifications, driver's licence is considered as a strong reference for one's personal identification in Bangladesh. Like Australia, New Zealand, Canada, the United Kingdom and the United States, a driving licence is a standard form of identification in Bangladesh. A person having a driving licence in Bangladesh can avoid carrying a collection of additional certificates to prove his identity to different government or non-government agencies.

== Penalties ==
Any law enforcer including the police, Rapid Action Battalion, Armed Police Battalion or military personnel in special duties are authorised to ask for driving licence if that specific driver is found to violate or being subjected to violation of any of the traffic or other laws while driving a vehicle. However, only the police are authorised to seize the licence and other authorisation documents of vehicles and then file cases against the violators if necessary. The licence can be held to be given in exchange of specific fines or can be permanently seized as per the laws.

== Hi-tech driving licences ==
Bangladesh Road Transport Authority has taken an initiative to make all the drivers licences high-tech, so that the step of identification in the police network become easier, it will have the drivers' identification data in a chip. It will have records of the driver's photograph, fingerprints, signature etc.

== See also ==
- Ministries of Bangladesh
- Government of Bangladesh
- Driving licenses check software
