= Vehicle registration plates of Bangladesh =

Bangladesh
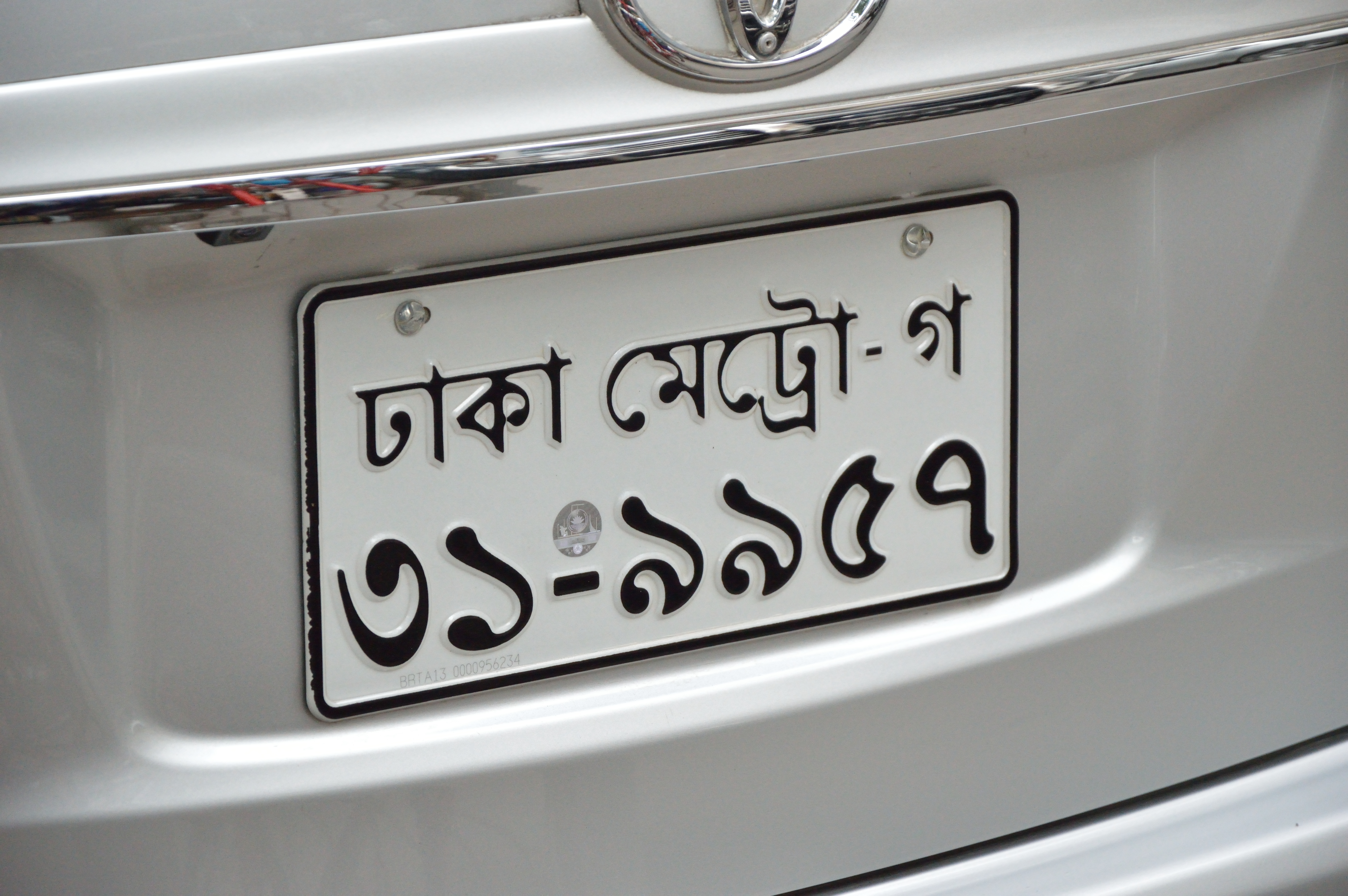
- Digital Number Plate for a private vehicle
- Country: Bangladesh
- Country code: BD

Current series
- Name: Digital Number Plate
- Size: Cars: 300 mm × 152 mm 11.8 in × 6.0 in Buses and Trucks: 350 mm × 152 mm 13.8 in × 6.0 in Motorcycles (Rear): 205 mm × 152 mm 8.1 in × 6.0 in Motorcycles (Front): 285 mm × 50 mm 11.2 in × 2.0 in Scooters (Front): 200 mm × 100 mm 7.9 in × 3.9 in
- Introduced: 2012

Availability
- Issued by: Bangladesh Road Transport Authority
- Manufactured by: Bangladesh Machine Tools Factory

In Bangladesh, the Bangladesh Road Transport Authority (BRTA) issues vehicle registration plates for motor vehicles. The vehicle registration plates in Bangladesh use the Bengali alphabet and Bengali numerals. They are produced by Bangladesh Machine Tools Factory, located in Gazipur. The current version of vehicle registration plates started in 1973, and the current digital number plates have been in use since 2012. The international vehicle registration code for Bangladesh is BD.

The general format of vehicle registration plates in Bangladesh is "city - vehicle class letter and number - vehicle number". For example, : "DHAKA-D-11-9999". The "DHAKA" field represents the city name in Bengali letters, the "D" field represents the vehicle class in Bengali letters, the "11" field represents the vehicle's registration series in Bengali numerals and the "9999" field represents the vehicle number of the vehicle in Bengali numerals.

The plates are installed in both the front and rear of the vehicle, with the rear plate permanently attached to the vehicle. The plate is only removed when the vehicle has reached the end of service and has been sold for scrap. New vehicles are not delivered to the purchaser until the plates have been attached at the dealership.

On October 31, 2012, the BRTA launched the Digital Number Plate project, where they would start to issue new standardized retro-reflective plates with embossed characters and an RFID tag for tracking and identification purposes. Private vehicles would have black characters on a white background, while commercial vehicles would use black characters on a green background.

Previously, private vehicles would have white characters on a black background, and commercial vehicles would have black characters on a white background, and the characters were sometimes painted on by hand.

In June 2020, the BRTA announced personalised number plates, where people can choose registrations numbers they prefer, for an increased registration fee.

1. If the last four digits are 00xx, (eg. xx-0011, xx-0022, etc.) the registration fee will be two times higher.
2. If the last four digits are a repeated pair, (eg. xx-1212, xx-5050, etc) the registration fee will be three times higher.
3. If the last four digits are the same, (eg. xx-1111, xx-4444, xx-5555, etc.) the registration fee will be four times higher.
4. If all six digits are a repeated pair, (eg. 20-2020, 35-3535, 42-4242 etc.) the registration fee will be five times higher.
5. If all six digits are the same, (eg. 22-2222, 55-5555, etc.) the registration fee will be six times higher.
6. If the registration number is 77-7777, the registration fee will be seven times higher.

On October 16 2026, the BRTA announced that 2-wheelers will be required to display registration plates on the front by November 15 2026, and specified distinct measurements for scooters and motorcycles. The measure was introduced to strengthen surveillance and traffic management by ALPR cameras. Vehicle owners are responsible to arrange the plates on their behalf as BRTA will not issue them.

== Appearance ==
Vehicle types
| Type | Appearance | Description |
|---|---|---|
| Private | ঢাকা মেট্রো-গ ১১-৯৯৯৯ | White plates are used by private vehicles (this colour scheme is also used by older commercial vehicles) |
| Commercial | ঢাকা মেট্রো-গ ১১-৯৯৯৯ | Green plates with black lettering are used in fare-hire vehicles like taxis, CNGs, and city buses |
| Electric Vehicles | ঢাকা মেট্রো-গ ১১-৯৯৯৯ | Green plates with white lettering are used in electric vehicles. |
| Diplomatic | দ১১-১১১ | Yellow and orange plates are used for foreign diplomats and international organizations. |
| Army | ↑ ১১১১১১১ | Black plates are for the vehicles that are owned by the Bangladesh Army in use for army officers. |
| Air Force | ↑ ১১১১১ | Black plates are used in staff cars of the Bangladesh Air Force. |
| Navy | বি এন ↑ ১১-১১১ | Blue plates are for the vehicles that are owned by the Bangladesh Navy only in use for the naval officers. |
| Police | ইঞ্জিন নং - ১১ ১১১১ সিএমপি - ১১১ | Black plates are for the vehicles that are owned by the Bangladesh Police only used for the police officers. These vehicles are usually given to Police Station's. Not registered under BRTA. Additionally white or black plates are used for Metropolitan Police Units with abbreviation of the unit. |
| City Corporation or local government | চেসিস নং - ১১১১১ | Authorities like city corporations and other local governments or government autonomous agencies use a "chassis number" which is different from the Vehicle identification number. |

== Format for Private and Commercial Vehicles ==
=== Part 1: Registration Region and Vehicle Class ===
License plates of Bangladesh are divided into two lines, the first of which displays the city or district in which the vehicle was registered in, followed by the vehicle's class represented by a Bengali letter.

=== Part 2: Registration Series and Number ===
The second line of the license plate shows a six-digit registration number acting as a unique identifier for the vehicle. It consists of a two-digit number representing the registration series it was registered in, followed by a registration number from 0001 to 9999. In older vehicles, the plate may not have a two-digit registration series number and instead may only have a 1-4 digit registration number displayed.

The letters permitted in the vehicle registration plate are:

অ ই উ এ ক খ গ ঘ ঙ চ ছ জ ঝ ট ঠ ড ঢ ত থ দ ন প ফ ব ভ ম য র ল শ স হ

The numerals permitted in the vehicle registration plate are:

০ ১ ২ ৩ ৪ ৫ ৬ ৭ ৮ ৯

White = Private service vehicle

Green = Commercial vehicle

| Vehicle Usage Colour | Vehicle Class Letter (Bangla) | BRTA Letter Code (English) | Vehicle Class Number Range | | Type of Vehicle | |
| Vehicle Usage Colour | Vehicle Class Letter (Bangla) | BRTA Letter Code (English) | From | To | Type of Vehicle | |
|---|---|---|---|---|---|---|
| White | এ | A | 11 | 99 | up to 100 cc | Motorcycle– Cruiser, Sport, Touring, Standard, Dual-sport, Dirt bike, Scooter |
| White | হ | HA | 11 | 99 | 101 to 125 cc | Motorcycle– Cruiser, Sport, Touring, Standard, Dual-sport, Dirt bike, Scooter |
| White | ল | LA | 11 | 99 | 126 to 165 cc | Motorcycle– Cruiser, Sport, Touring, Standard, Dual-sport, Dirt bike, Scooter |
| White | ক | KA | 11 | 99 | up to 1000 cc | Motorcar– Sedan, Coupe Hatchback, Convertible, Station wagon, Sports car |
| White | খ | KHA | 11 | 99 | 1001 to 1300 cc | Motorcar– Sedan, Coupe Hatchback, Convertible, Station wagon, Sports car |
| White | গ | GA | 11 | 99 | 1301 to 2000 cc | Motorcar– Sedan, Coupe Hatchback, Convertible, Station wagon, Sports car |
| White | ভ | BHA | 11 | 99 | above 2001 cc | Motorcar– Sedan, Coupe Hatchback, Convertible, Station wagon, Sports car |
| White | ঘ | GHA | 11 | 99 | SUV, Crossover | |
| White | চ | CHA | 11 | 50 | Microbus, MPV | |
| White | চ | CHA | 51 | 99 | Microbus, MPV | |
| Green | প | PA | 11 | 99 | Taxicab | |
| Green | ছ | CAA | 11 | 70 | Human hauler | |
| White | ছ | CAA | 71 | 99 | Ambulance | |
| Green | জ | JA | 11 | 99 | Minibus | |
| White | ঝ | JHA | 11 | 99 | Coach bus | |
| Green | ব | BA | 11 | 99 | Inter-city & Inter-district bus– Double-decker, Single-decker, Articulated bus | |
| White | স | SA | 11 | 99 | School bus, College bus | |
| Green | ত | TWA | 11 | 99 | Mishuk | Auto rickshaws |
| Green | থ | TAW | 11 | 99 | Baby taxi, CNG | Auto rickshaws |
| White | দ | DWA | 11 | 99 | Baby taxi, CNG | Auto rickshaws |
| Green | ফ | FA | 11 | 99 | Auto tempo | |
| White | ঠ | THA | 11 | 99 | Dual-purpose vehicle– pick-up with double cabin, pick-up with single cabin, Panel van, passenger van, prison van, security van, standard van, troop carriage, panel van | |
| White | ম | MA | 51 | 99 | up to 2.5 tonnes | Delivery van, Mini-truck |
| White | ম | MA | 11 | 50 | up to 3.5 tonnes | Truck– Cargo truck (closed or open), Tipper/Dump truck, Cargo van, Covered van, Flatbed truck, Low-bed truck, Bottle carrier, Pole carrier, Demountable truck, Rigid truck |
| Green | ন | NA | 11 | 99 | up to 3.5 tonnes | Truck– Cargo truck (closed or open), Tipper/Dump truck, Cargo van, Covered van, Flatbed truck, Low-bed truck, Bottle carrier, Pole carrier, Demountable truck, Rigid truck |
| White | অ | AU | 11 | 99 | 3.5 to 7.5 tonnes | Truck– Cargo truck (closed or open), Tipper/Dump truck, Cargo van, Covered van, Flatbed truck, Low-bed truck, Bottle carrier, Pole carrier, Demountable truck, Rigid truck |
| Green | ড | DA | 11 | 99 | 3.5 to 7.5 tonnes | Truck– Cargo truck (closed or open), Tipper/Dump truck, Cargo van, Covered van, Flatbed truck, Low-bed truck, Bottle carrier, Pole carrier, Demountable truck, Rigid truck |
| White | উ | U | 11 | 99 | 7.5 to 22 tonnes | Truck– Cargo truck (closed or open), Tipper/Dump truck, Cargo van, Covered van, Flatbed truck, Low-bed truck, Bottle carrier, Pole carrier, Demountable truck, Rigid truck |
| Green | ট | TA | 11 | 99 | 7.5 to 22 tonnes | Truck– Cargo truck (closed or open), Tipper/Dump truck, Cargo van, Covered van, Flatbed truck, Low-bed truck, Bottle carrier, Pole carrier, Demountable truck, Rigid truck |
| White | ঢ | DHA | 11 | 40 | Private articulated vehicle | |
| Green | ঢ | DHA | 41 | 60 | Oil tanker, Water tanker | |
| White | ঢ | DHA | 61 | 80 | Semi-trailer truck– Flatbed, Lowbed, Container chassis, Gas tanker | |
| Green | ঢ | DHA | 81 | 99 | Semi-trailer truck– Flatbed, Lowbed, Container chassis, Gas tanker | |
| White | শ | SHA | 11 | 99 | Special purpose vehicle– Concrete mixer/pumper, Cement bulker, Constructional truck, Freezer van, Tow truck, Boom truck, Mobile crane, Garbage truck, Streetcleaner, crash tender, earth digger/remover, foam tender, forklift, grander, hearse, invalid carriage, ladder carrier, payloader, refuse vehicle, Small tanker | |
| White | ই | E | 11 | 60 | Agricultural vehicle – power tiller, tractor | |
| White | ই | E | 61 | 99 | – | |
| White | য | ZA | 11 | 99 | Prime Minister's office (any vehicle) | |
| White | র | RA | 11 | 99 | President's office (any vehicle) | |
