= Syed Mansoob Murshed =

Mansoob Murshed is a professor of International Industrial Economics at the University of Birmingham whose research interests are development, globalisation and conflict / post-conflict reconstruction. Alongside his post at Birmingham he also holds a Professorship at the Institute of Social Studies (ISS) The Hague, on the Economies of Conflict and Peace. He holds an honorary fellowship at the Peace Research Institute Oslo (PRIO) and his having been the first to be awarded the Prince Claus rotating Chair in Development and Equity (established in memory of Prince Claus, a Prince Consort of the Netherlands).

Murshed's father was Syed Mahbub Murshed, Chief Justice of East Pakistan High Court, and mother was Lyla Arzumand Banu.
