= Muhammad Omar Farooq =

Bangladeshi politician

- মুহাম্মদ ওমর ফারেক

Personal details
- Born: January , 1

Muhammad Omar Farooq also known as Omar Fareq is a retired secretary of the Ministry of Home Affairs and former chairman of the Bangladesh Telecommunication Regulatory Commission. He had served under Lutfozzaman Babar, Minister of Home Affairs.

== Career ==
In 2003 and 2004, Farooq was the secretary of the Ministry of Home Affairs.
