= Md. Abu Bakar =

Bangladeshi politician

- আবু বকর

Member of Bangladesh Parliament
- In office 1991–1995
- Preceded by: Yakub Ali
- Succeeded by: Kazi Golam Morshed

Personal details
- Party: Bangladesh Jamaat-e-Islami

Md. Abu Bakar is a politician, writer, and a former member of parliament for Natore-3.

== Career ==
Bakar was elected to parliament from Natore-3 as a candidate of the Bangladesh Jamaat-e-Islami in 1991.
