= Z1086 (Bangladesh) =

Z1086
- Sitakunda (Baroirdala)–Hazarikhil–Fatikchhari (Haidchakia) Road

Route information
- Maintained by Roads and Highways Department
- Length: 22.66 km (14.08 mi)

Major junctions
- West end: Sitakunda (Baroirdala)
- East end: Pelagazi Dighi (Fatikchhari)

Location
- Country: Bangladesh

Highway system
- Roads in Bangladesh
← N1	→ R160

The Z1086 or Sitakunda (Baroirdala)–Hazarikhil-Fatikchhari (Haidchakia) Road is a transportation artery in Bangladesh, which connects Dhaka–Chittagong Highway from Baroirdala (Sitakunda) with Regional Highway R160 at Pelaghazi Dighi. It is 22.66 kilometres (14.08 mi) long, and the road is a Zila Road of the Roads and Transport department of Bangladesh.

== Junction list ==
The entire route is in Chittagong District.

Location	km	Mile	Destinations	Notes
Baroirdala (Sitakunda)			N1	Start
Pelaghazi Dighi			R160	End

== Markets crossed ==
- Hazarikhil
- Noyahat

== See also ==
- N1 (Bangladesh)
