= Kazi Golam Morshed =

Bangladeshi politician

- কাজী গোলাম মোর্শেদ

Member of Bangladesh Parliament
- In office 1st term
- In office 1995 – February 1996
- Preceded by: Md. Abu Bakar
- Succeeded by: Abul Kalam Azad
- In office 2nd and 3rd term
- In office June 1996 – 2006
- Preceded by: Abul Kalam Azad
- Succeeded by: Zunaid Ahmed Palak

Personal details
- Party: Bangladesh Nationalist Party

Kazi Golam Morshed is a Bangladesh Nationalist Party politician and a former member of parliament for Natore-3.

== Career ==
Morshed was elected to parliament from Natore-3 as a Bangladesh Nationalist Party candidate in 1995, 1996, and 2001. He was arrested by the Bangladesh Police in 2015. He is the vice-president of Natore District unit of Bangladesh Nationalist Party.
