= Shahjahan Mahmood =

Bangladeshi civil servant

Bangladesh Communication Satellite Company Limited
- In office 12 July 2018 – 2020
- Appointed by: President of Bangladesh
- President: Mohammad Abdul Hamid

Chairman Bangladesh Telecommunication Regulatory Commission
- In office 24 September 2015 – 1 September 2018
- Preceded by: Sunil Kanti Bose
- Succeeded by: Md Jahurul Haque

Personal details
- Education: Bangladesh University of Engineering and Technology
- Profession: Systems engineer

Shahjahan Mahmood is a Bangladeshi technocrat and chairman of the Bangladesh Communication Satellite Company Limited. He is the former chairman of the Bangladesh Telecommunication Regulatory Commission.

== Early life ==
Mahmood completed his undergraduate studies in engineering from Bangladesh University of Engineering and Technology. He completed his master's degree in operation research and PhD in systems engineering from the Massachusetts Institute of Technology.

== Career ==
Mahmood was a systems engineer at Marine Corps Base Quantico and later at Indian Head Naval Surface Warfare Center from 2004 to 2012.

On 24 September 2015, Mahmood was appointed chairman of the Bangladesh Telecommunication Regulatory Commission replacing Sunil Kanti Bose. Initially Iqbal Mahmood was appointed chairman of the Bangladesh Telecommunication Regulatory Commission but that decision was cancelled within a week and was replaced by Shahjahan Mahmood. He briefly blocked Facebook, Viber, and WhatsApp in Bangladesh.

In March 2017, Mahmood announced he was ready to shut down Facebook in Bangladesh if instructed by the government. He recommended that the government terminate Golam Razzaque, director of Bangabandhu-1 satellite, which the government did. He left the Bangladesh Telecommunication Regulatory Commission in 2018 and was replaced by Md Jahirul Haque.

As chairman of the Bangladesh Communication Satellite Company Limited, Mahmood oversaw the launch of Bangabandhu-1, the first satellite of Bangladesh.
