= Manzurul Alam =

Bangladeshi general

- Military career
- Allegiance: Bangladesh
- Branch: Bangladesh Army
- Service years: 1979–2011
- Rank: Major General
- Unit: Corps of Signals
- Commands: Chairman of Bangladesh Telecommunication Regulatory Commission; General Officer Commanding of 11th Infantry Division; Commandant of Signals Training Centre and School

Manzurul Alam ndc, psc is a retired major general of the Bangladesh Army and former chairperson of the Bangladesh Telecommunication Regulatory Commission.

== Career ==
Alam was general officer commanding the 11th Infantry Division, Bogra, of the Bangladesh Army.

On 19 April 2007, Alam was appointed the chairperson of the Bangladesh Telecommunication Regulatory Commission. He announced plans to provide free internet to schools. He approved mergers of telecom companies in Bangladesh but wanted to prevent the creation of monopolies at the same time. He approved policies for VoIP services in Bangladesh and gateway companies. He discussed with the Bangladesh Amateur Radio League about providing licenses to amateur radio operators in Bangladesh. He increased the allocated spectrum for three cellphone operators. He fined Banglalink for operating illegal VoIP.

Alam served as the chairperson of the Bangladesh Telecommunication Regulatory Commission until 10 February 2009. He later criticized the government of Bangladesh for providing too many licenses for gateway companies.

Alam plays golf and won a prize in the Turkish Airlines World Golf Cup held in Kurmitola Golf Club in 2016.
