= Bangladesh Telecommunication Regulatory Commission =

Independent commission of the Bangladeshi government

- Abbreviation: BTRC
- Formation: 2002
- Purpose: Regulate telecommunication in Bangladesh
- Headquarters: Agargaon, Sher-e-Bangla Nagar, Dhaka
- Region served: Bangladesh
- Official language: Bengali
- Chairman: Major General (Rtd.) Md. Emdad-Ul-Bari
- Parent organization: Posts and Telecommunications Division
- Website: www.btrc.gov.bd

Bangladesh Telecommunication Regulatory Commission (BTRC) (Bengali: বাংলাদেশ টেলিযোগাযোগ নিয়ন্ত্রণ কমিশন) is an independent commission founded under the Bangladesh Telecommunication Regulation Act, 2001 (Act no. 18 of 2001). The commission is responsible for regulating all matters related to telecommunications (wire, cellular, satellite and cable) of Bangladesh. The chairman of the commission has the status of a judge of the High Court Division. Since 10 September 2024, Md. Emdad-Ul-Bari has been the chairman of the commission.

== History ==
In 1979, the Bangladesh Telegraph and Telephone Board was established through the Bangladesh Telegraph and Telephone Board Ordinance, 1975. The ordinance was revised in 1995.

The BTRC started operating from 31 January 2002 with a vision of facilitating affordable telecommunication services and increasing the teledensity to at least 10 telephones per 100 inhabitants by 2010. The ordinance was updated with the passage of the Telecommunication Act (Corrected) bill in 2010.

In 2016, the salaries of the commissions and chairman was doubled by the government of Bangladesh.

=== Censorship ===
In March 2013, BTRC was criticised by the Human Rights Watch and other groups for banning a number of "atheist blogger" websites. Blogs banned by the BTRC included the award-winning popular blog by Asif Mohiuddin, who had been attacked by a machete wielding group in January.

Mohiuddin was arrested the following month, along with three other bloggers .

== Chairmen ==
Sl No.	Name	Term start	Term end	Reference
1.	Syed Margub Murshed	31 January 2002	30 January 2005	
2.	Muhammad Omar Farooq	31 March 2005	15 March 2007	
3.	Major General Manzurul Alam	22 April 2007	10 February 2009	
4.	Major General Zia Ahmed	26 February 2009	10 September 2012	
5.	Md. Giashuddin Ahmed	10 September 2012	22 October 2012	
6.	Sunil Kanti Bose	23 October 2012	23 September 2015	
7.	Shahjahan Mahmood	24 September 2015	1 September 2018	
8.	Md Jahurul Haque	31 January 2019	4 December 2020	
9.	Shyam Sunder Sikder	14 December 2020	11 December 2023	
10.	Md Mohiuddin Ahmed	11 December 2023	19 August 2024	
11.	Major General (Retd.) Md. Emdad-Ul-Bari	10 September 2024		

== Gallery ==
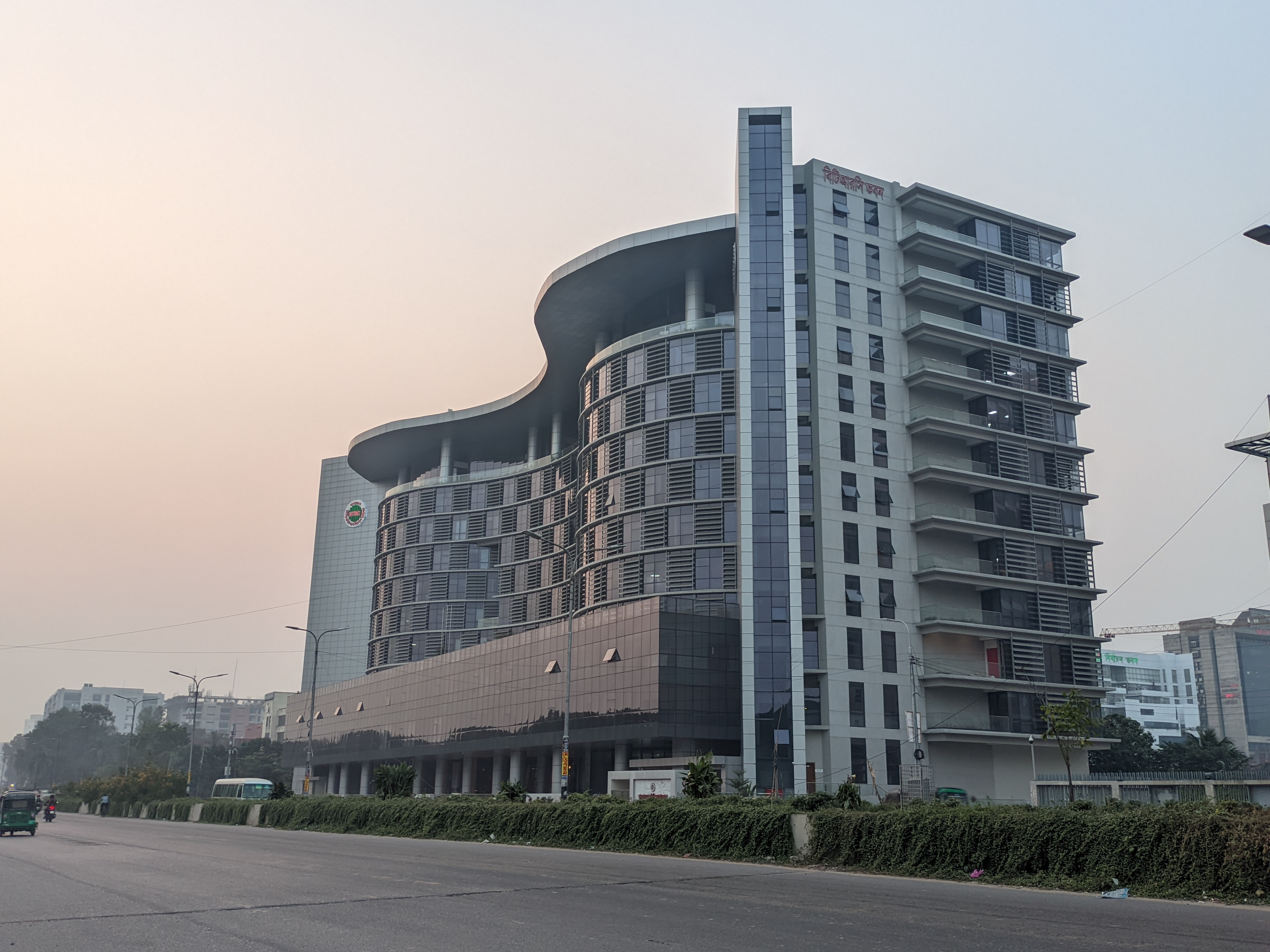
BTRC Bhaban

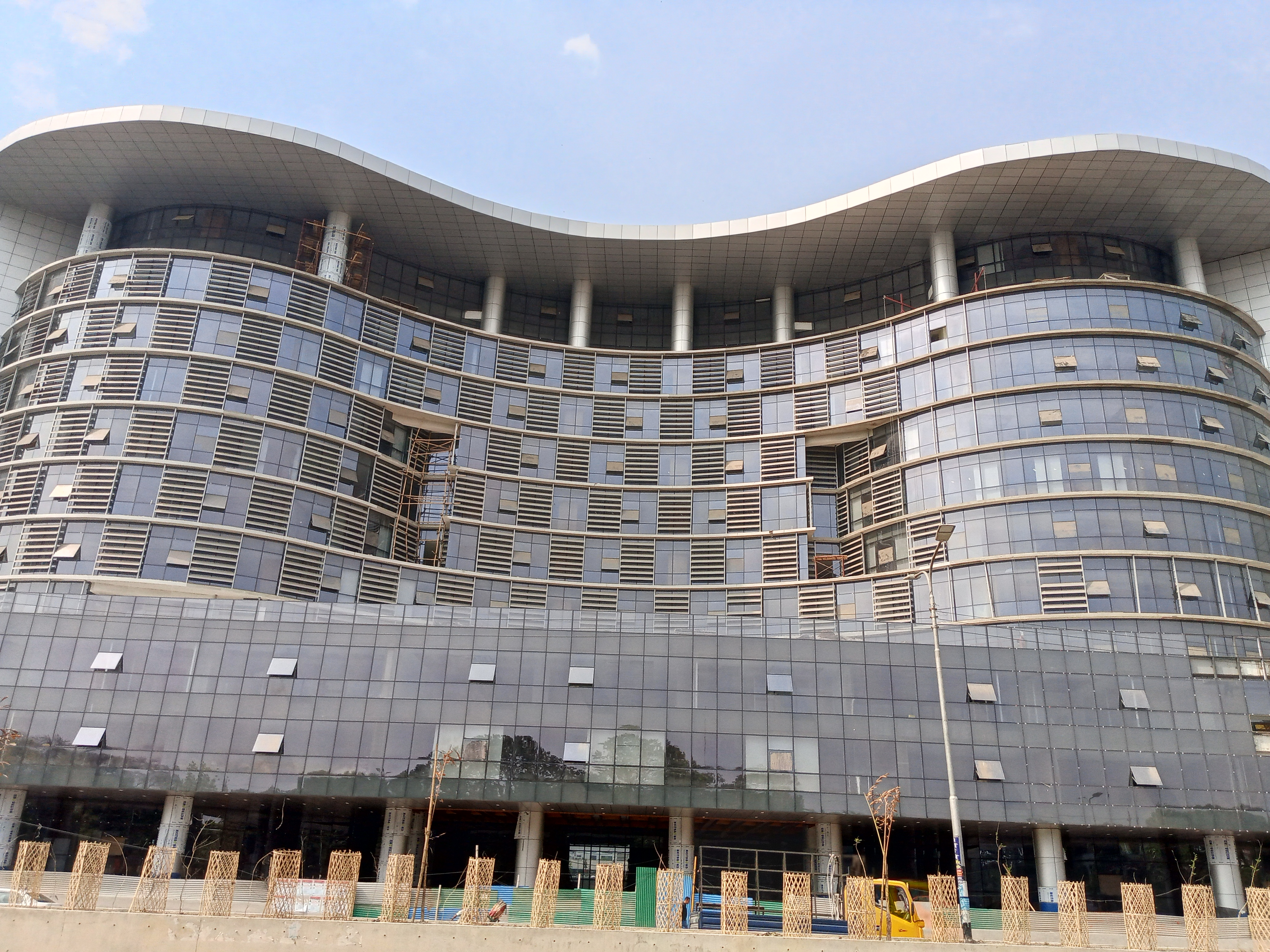
Under Construction in BTRC Building

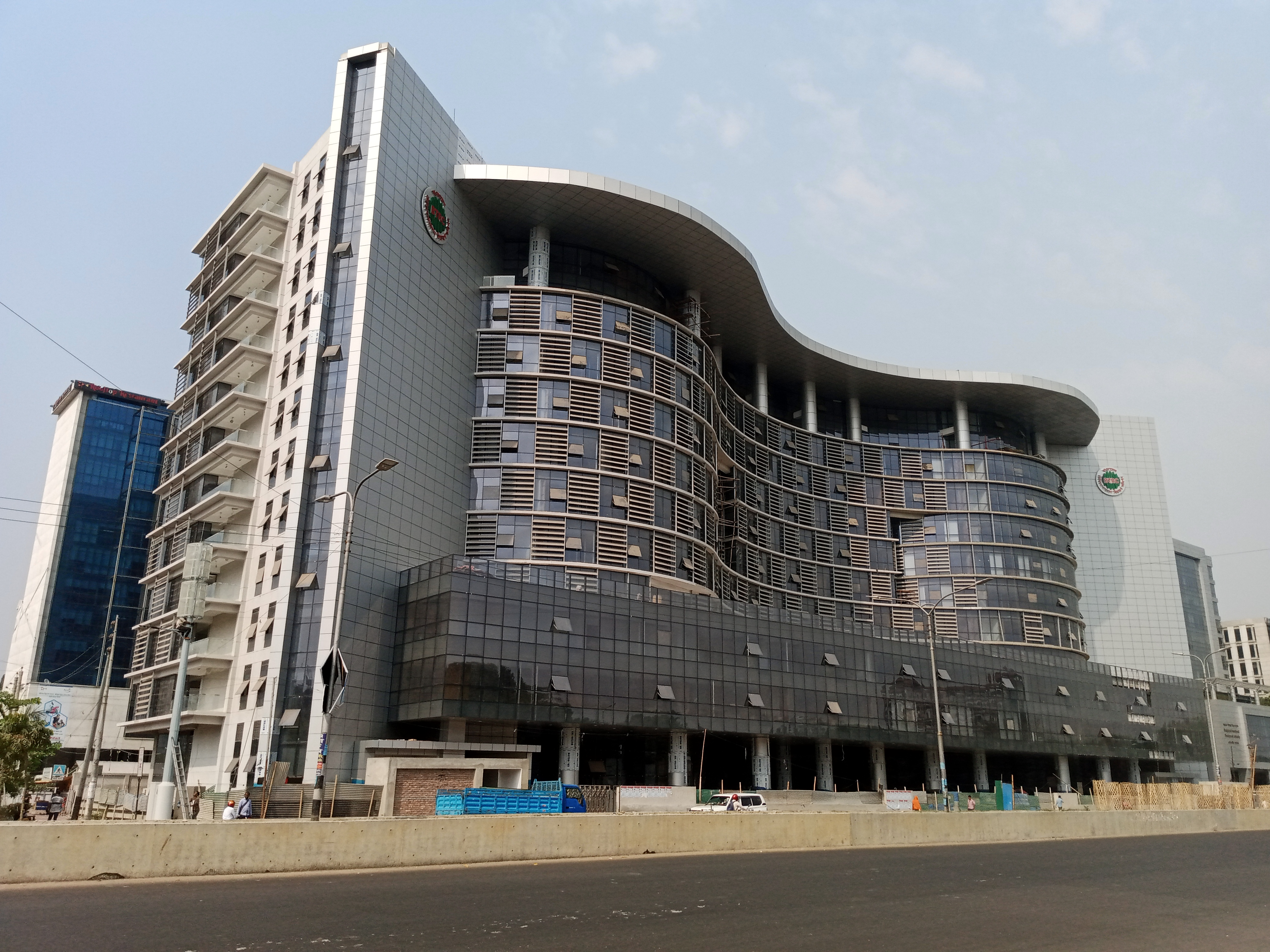
Under Construction in BTRC Building Southwest side

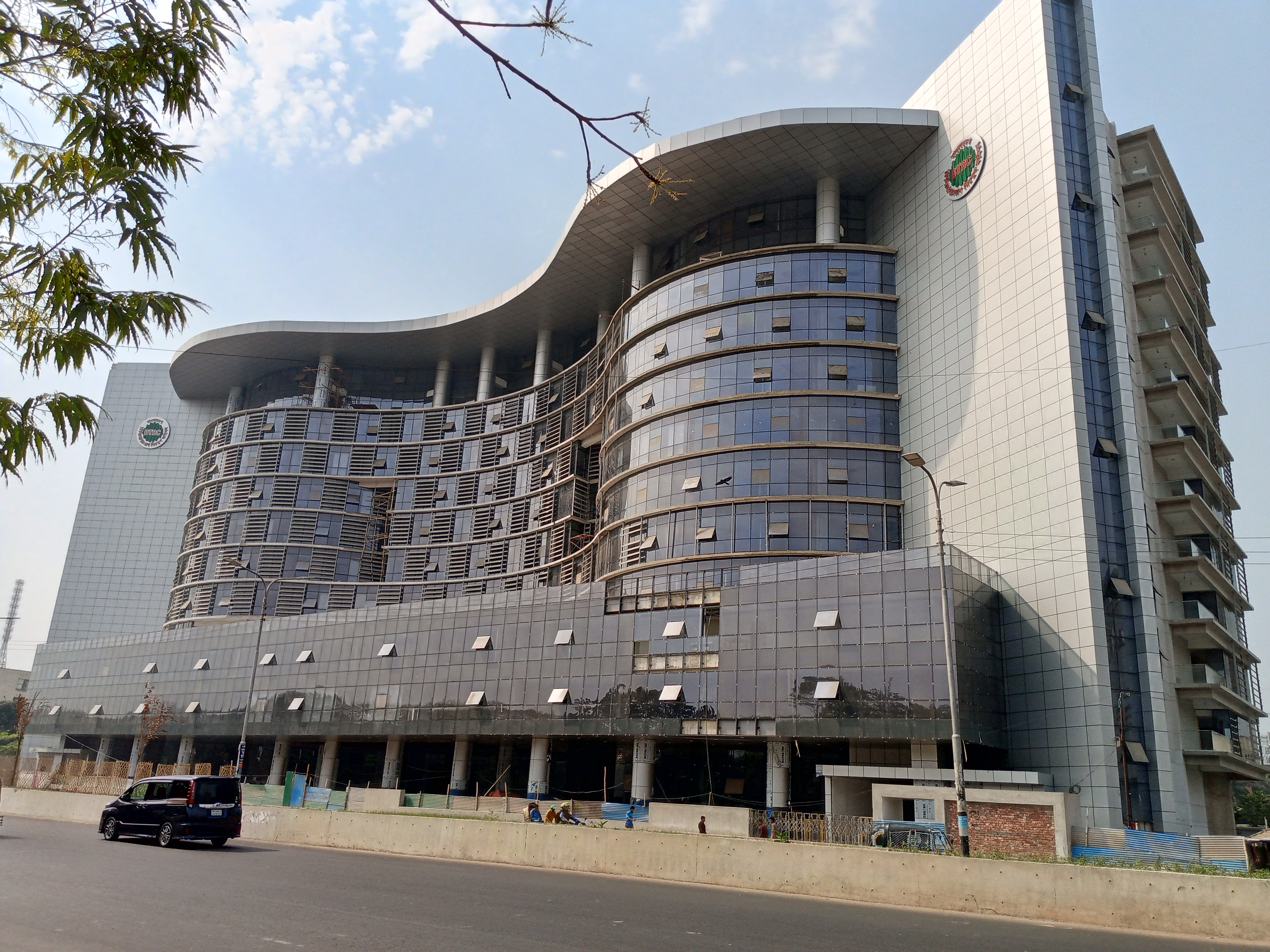
Under Construction in BTRC Building Southeast side

== See also ==
- Bangladesh Public Service Commission
- Bangladesh Civil Service
- Bangladesh Road Transport Authority
