= Singra Upazila =

Singra Upazila সিংড়া উপজেলা
- Upazila of Bangladesh
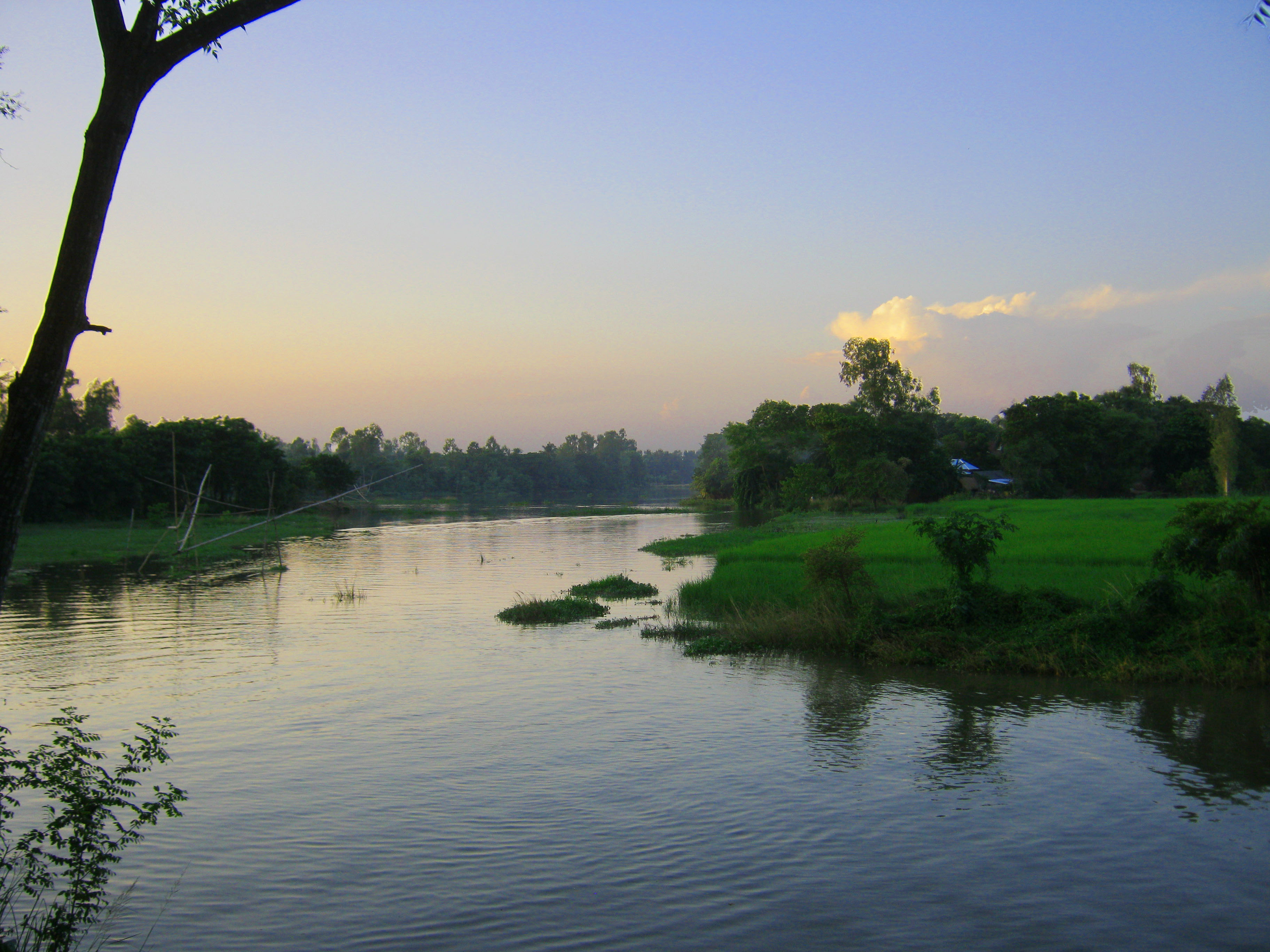
- Countryside of Singra Upazila

- Coordinates: 24°30′N 89°08′E
- Country: Bangladesh
- Division: Rajshahi
- District: Natore

Area
  - Total: 528.47 km^{2} (204.04 sq mi)

Population (2022)
  - Total: 381,316
  - Density: 721.55/km^{2} (1,868.8/sq mi)
- Time zone: UTC+6 (BST)
- Postal code: 6450
- Website: Official Map of Singra

Singra Upazila mauza geocode map

Singra Upazila (Bengali: সিংড়া উপজেলা) is an upazila of Natore District in the Division of Rajshahi, Bangladesh.

== History ==
The area was governed by the Zamindars of Bengal and Natore, under the Rajshahi Raj family and the Dighapatia Raj families from the 1700s to the mid-1800s, and then under the Singranatore family from the late 1800s till 1951 when the Zamindari system was abolished by Pakistan.

== Geography ==
Singra is located at 24°30′N 89°08′E. It has 88,791 households and total area 528.47 km^{2}.

Singra, with an area of 528.46 km^{2}, is bounded by Nandigram upazila (Bogura) on the north, Gurudaspur upazila on the south, Tarash (Sirajganj) and Sherpur (Bogra) upazilas on the east, Natore Sadar, Naldanga, Atrai and Raninagar upazilas on the west.

== Demographics ==
Religions in Singra Upazila (2022)
Religion	Percent
Islam	92.01%
Hinduism	7.93%
Other or not stated	0.06%

According to the 2022 Bangladeshi census, Singra Upazila had 100,939 households and a population of 381,316. 8.30% of the population were under 5 years of age. Singra had a literacy rate (age 7 and over) of 66.95%: 69.69% for males and 64.23% for females, and a sex ratio of 99.45 males for every 100 females. 69,105 (18.12%) lived in urban areas.

According to the 2011 Census of Bangladesh, Singra Upazila had 88,791 households and a population of 364,382. 78,776 (21.62%) were under 10 years of age. Singra had a literacy rate (age 7 and over) of 42.93%, compared to the national average of 51.8%, and a sex ratio of 996 females per 1000 males. 33,192 (9.11%) lived in urban areas. Ethnic population was 3,241 (0.89%), of which Oraon were 2,196.

According to the 2001 Bangladesh census, Singra upazila had a population of 3,20,818; male constituted 165673 of the population, females 155145; Muslims 289187, Hindus 30877, Buddhists 275, and others 478. Indigenous community such as santal belongs to this upazila.

As of the 1991 Bangladesh census, Singra had a population of 289952. Males constituted 51.29% of the population, and females 48.71%. This Upazila's eighteen up population is 139625. Singra had an average literacy rate of 25.2% (7+ years), and the national average of 32.4% literate.

== Administration ==
Singra thana was established in 1869 and was turned into an upazila in 1983.

Singra Upazila is divided into Singra Municipality and 12 union parishads: Chamari, Chhatardighi, Chaugram, Dahia, Hatiandaha, Italy, Kalam, Lalore, Ramanandakhajura, Sherkole, Tajpur, and Sukash. The union parishads are subdivided into 446 mauzas and 424 villages.

Singra Municipality is subdivided into 12 wards and 33 mahallas.

The area of the town is 11.70 km^{2}. The town has a population of 22517; male 50.54%, female 49.46%. The town has one dakbungalow.

Marks of the War of Liberation Mass grave 1 (Kumarpara).

Population: About four lacs; male 51.29%, female 48.71%; Muslim 87.59%, Hindu 11.46% and others 0.95%; ethnic national: Santal.

Religious institutions: Mosque 417, temple 75, church 2, tomb 4. Literacy and educational institutions: Average literacy 36.73%; male 45% and female 35%.

== See also ==
- Upazilas of Bangladesh
- Districts of Bangladesh
- Divisions of Bangladesh

== Album ==
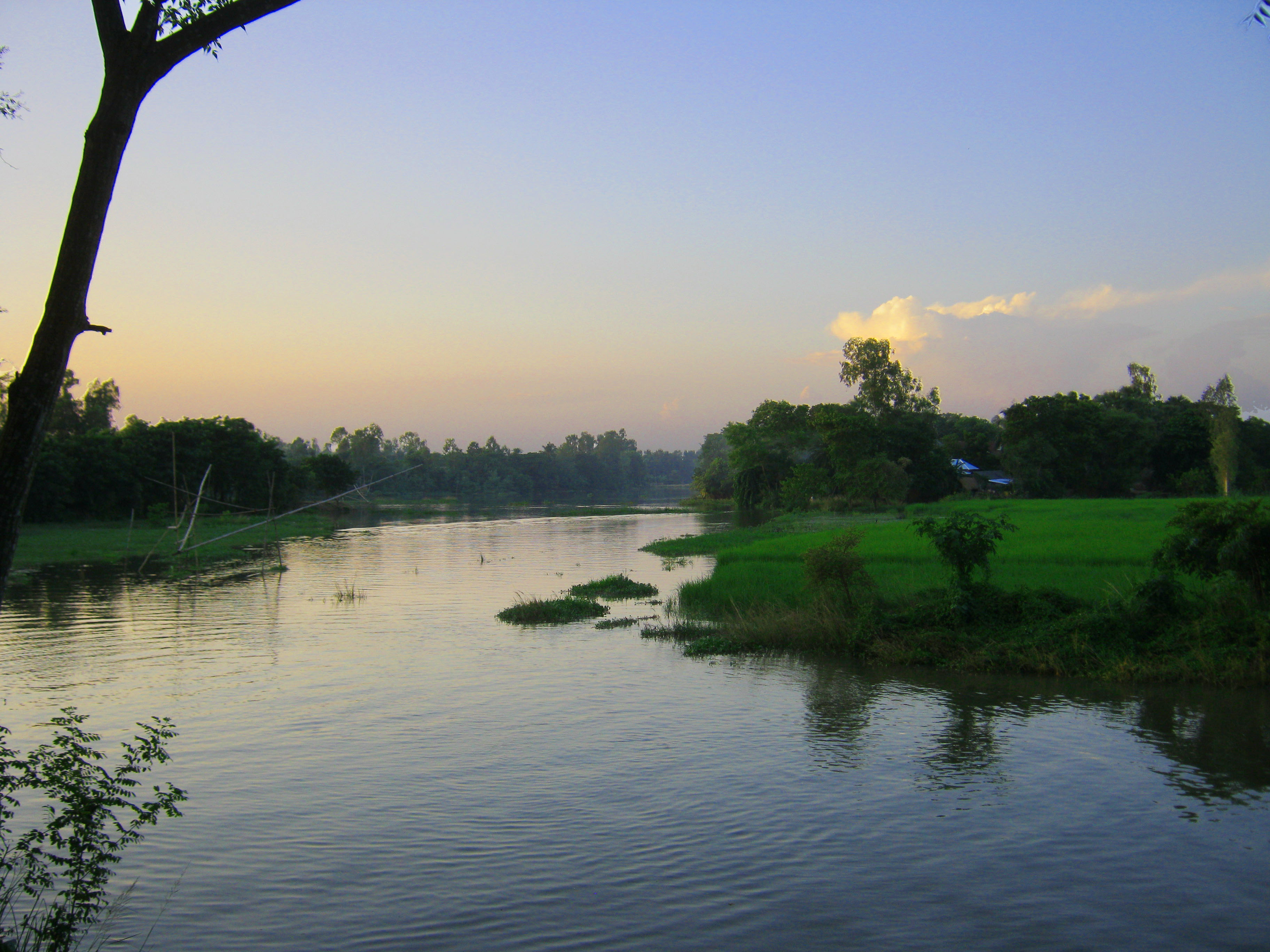
A village of Singra

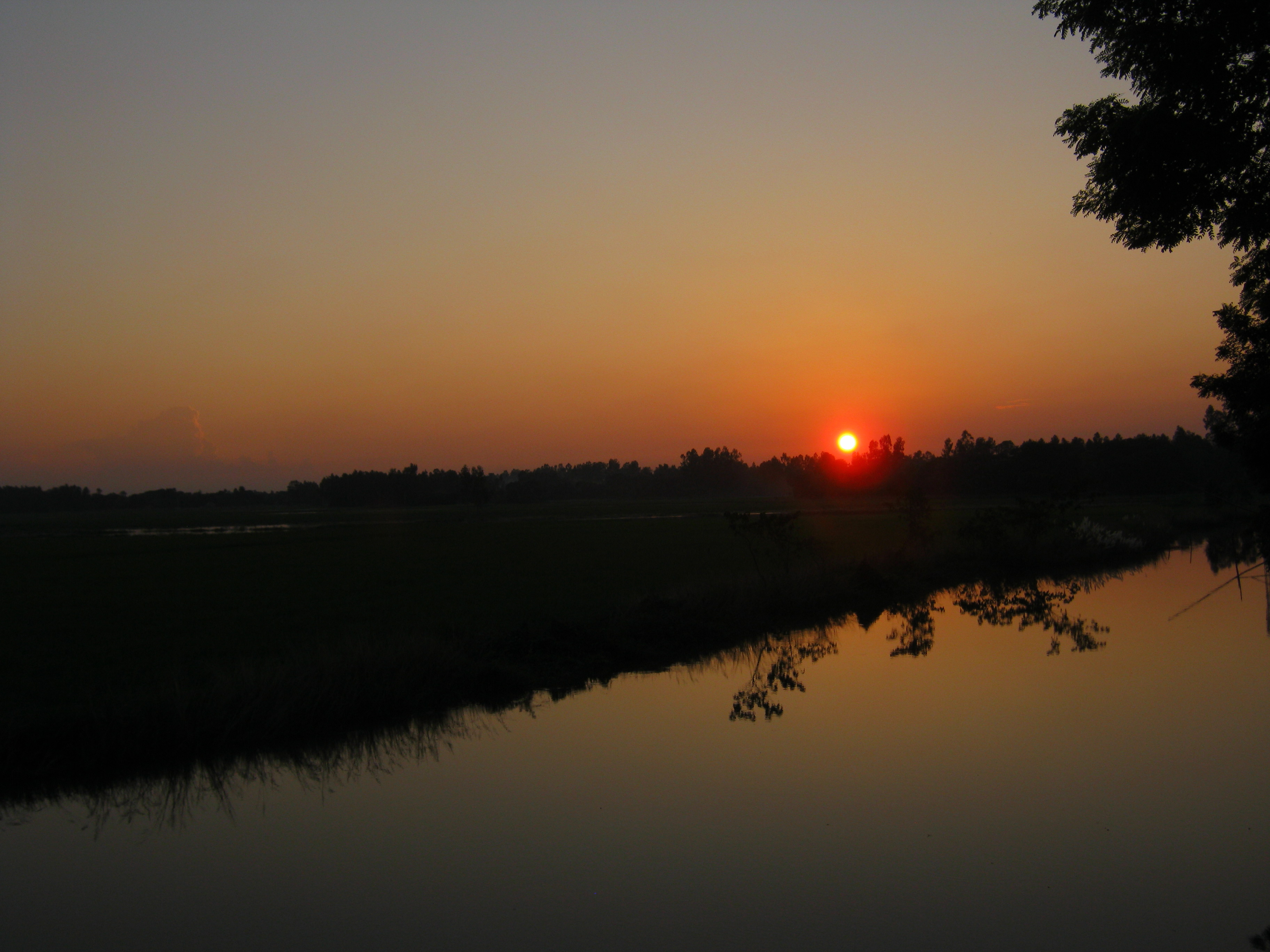
Sunset in Scenery

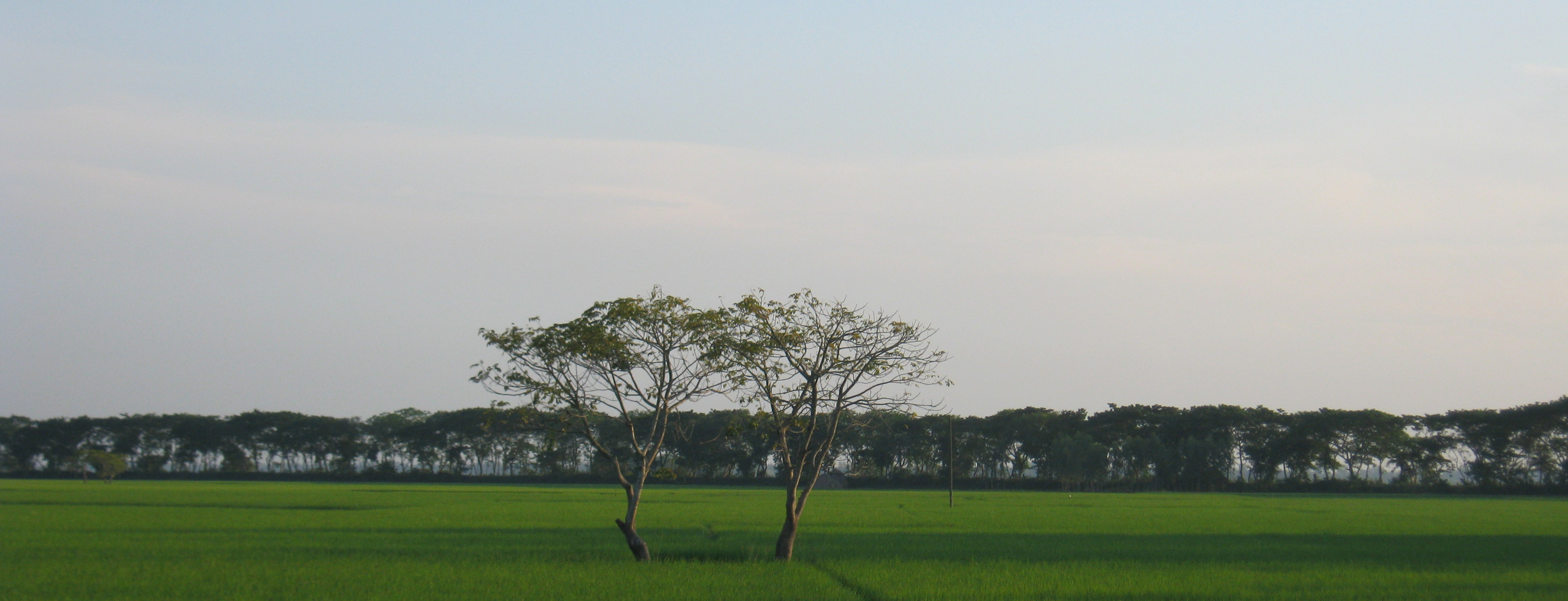
A Village of Singra
