= Bangladesh Road Transport Authority =

Road transport regulatory agency of Bangladesh

- বাংলাদেশ রোড ট্রান্সপোর্ট অথরিটি
- Seal of Bangladesh Road Transport Authority

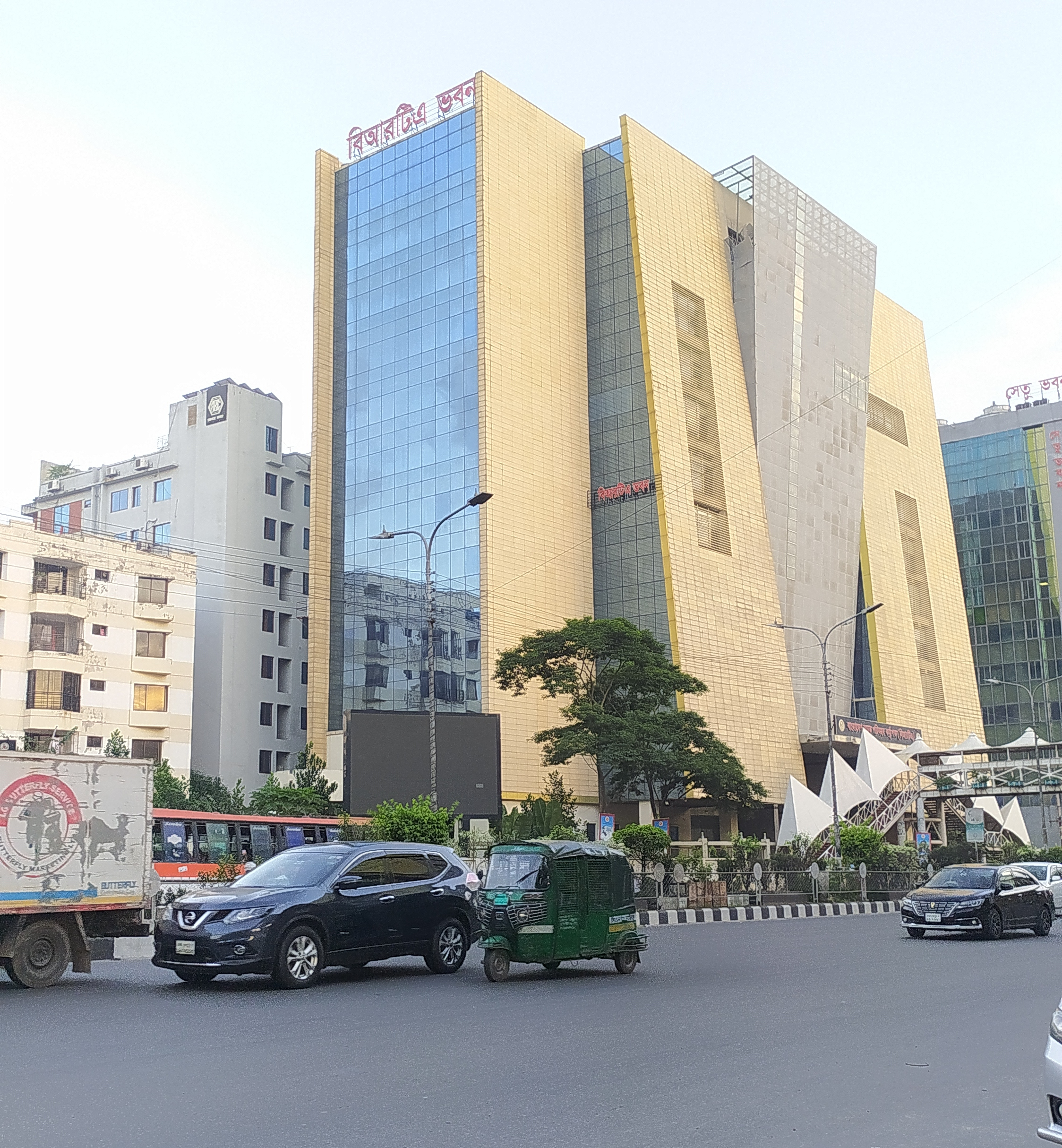

Agency overview
- Formed: 1987; 39 years ago
- Jurisdiction: Bangladesh
- Headquarters: BRTA Building, Banani, Dhaka
- Annual budget: Allocated by Government
- Agency executives: Mohammad Yasin, Chairman; Mohammad Kamrul Islam Chowdhury, Director
- Parent agency: Ministry of Road Transport and Bridges
- Website: brta.gov.bd

The Bangladesh Road Transport Authority is a regulatory body for ensuring order in the road transport sector and road safety in Bangladesh.

== History ==
The Bangladesh Road Transport Authority was established under section 2A of the Motor Vehicle Ordinance of 1983 and the subsequent 1987 amendment. It has functioned since January 1988. BRTA is a regulatory body to control, manage, and ensure discipline in the road transport sector of Bangladesh, as well as to maintain road safety. It works under the Ministry of Road Transport and Bridges to carry out the purposes set out for it under the Motor Vehicle Ordinance.

The chairman is the chief executive of BRTA. The chairman is in charge of fulfilling the purposes of BRTA as prescribed by the rules and assigned by the government. The total number of circles under the purview of BRTA is 62 (57 district circles and five metro circles).

The government of Bangladesh has initiated the first-ever specialized road safety project in South Asia. Supported by $358 million in funding from the World Bank, this project aims to prioritize selected cities, high-risk highways, and district roads in order to minimize road accidents.

== Activities ==
- Controlling and regulating road transport by executing motor vehicle acts, issuing route permits, and fixing rates and fares of buses and trucks
- Conducting regular activities like issuing: driving licenses, fitness certificates, registration certificates, and driving instructor's licenses
- Registering schools for motoring
- Organizing and conducting workshop seminars for delivering information regarding safe driving and traffic regulations
- Making research and development for developing ideas and methodologies for safe road transport and traffic system

== Services ==
- Vehicle registration
- Fitness & tax token issues
- Route permit issues
- Number plate issues
- Driving license issues

== List of chairmen ==
Serial No.	Name	Term start	Term end	Reference
01	Nur Mohammad Akon	26 January 1988	31 October 1989	
02	Moazzem Hossain Khan	12 December 1989	18 November 1991	
03	A. H. M. B. Zaman	18 November 1991	12 March 1995	
04	S. K. Chowdhury	13 March 1995	19 April 1995	
05	Md. Ismail Hossain	20 April 1995	22 April 1996	
06	A. N. Hussain	25 April 1996	16 March 1999	
07	S. K. Chowdhury	25 March 1999	9 May 1999	
08	Md. Humayun Kabir	10 May 1999	18 December 1999	
09	Md. Asad-uz-Zaman Bhuiyan	28 December 1999	1 February 2000	
10	Md. Azizul Haque Bhuiyan	1 February 2000	3 March 2001	
11	Md. Azizul Haque Bhuiyan	4 March 2001	21 November 2001	
12	Khawaja Golam Ahmed	10 December 2001	8 May 2002	
13	Mohammad Jalal Uddin	8 May 2002	13 September 2003	
14	Mahmud Hassan Munsur	13 September 2003	10 June 2004	
15	Farooq Ahmed	14 June 2004	2 July 2005	
16	M. A. Momen	2 July 2005	14 March 2006	
17	Md. Shahidullah	14 March 2006	31 May 2006	
18	Md. Abdul Wahab	1 June 2006	28 June 2006	
19	Abu Bakr Md. Shahjahan	28 June 2006	4 December 2006	
20	Abu Bakr Md. Shahjahan	5 December 2006	10 January 2008	
21	Sunil Kanti Bose	10 January 2008	17 January 2009	
22	Kamrul Hassan	21 January 2009	27 January 2009	
23	Kamrul Hassan	27 January 2009	11 June 2009	
24	Md. Ehsanul Haque	11 June 2009	17 February 2010	
25	A. K. S. Abdus Salam	17 February 2010	18 March 2010	
26	Md. Ayubur Rahman Khan	18 March 2010	31 March 2013	
27	ALM Abdur Rahman	1 April 2013	21 July 2013	
28	Md. Nazrul Islam	21 July 2013	28 December 2016	
29	Mohammed Moshiar Rahman	28 December 2016	23 October 2019	
30	Kamrul Ahsan	23 October 2019	4 November 2019	
31	Kamrul Ahsan	5 November 2019	25 March 2020	
32	Yusuf Ali Molla	25 March 2020	25 June 2020	
33	Nur Mohammad Mazumder	25 June 2020	27 June 2024	
34	Gautam Chandra Pal	27 June 2024	1 October 2024	
35	Md. Yasin	1 October 2024	21 June 2025	
36	Abu Momtaz Saad Uddin Ahmed	21 June 2025		

== See also ==
- Bangladesh Road Transport Corporation
- Driving license in Bangladesh
- Vehicle registration plates of Bangladesh
