= George Langley =

George Langley may refer to:

- George Langley (politician) (1852–1933), English-born farmer and political figure in Saskatchewan
- George Colt Langley (1810–1896), Royal Marines officer
- George Furner Langley (1891–1971), Australian soldier, educationist and headmaster
- George Harry Langley (1881–1951), English academic wand vice-chancellor of the University of Dhaka
