= Burdwan House =

Historic Building in Dhaka

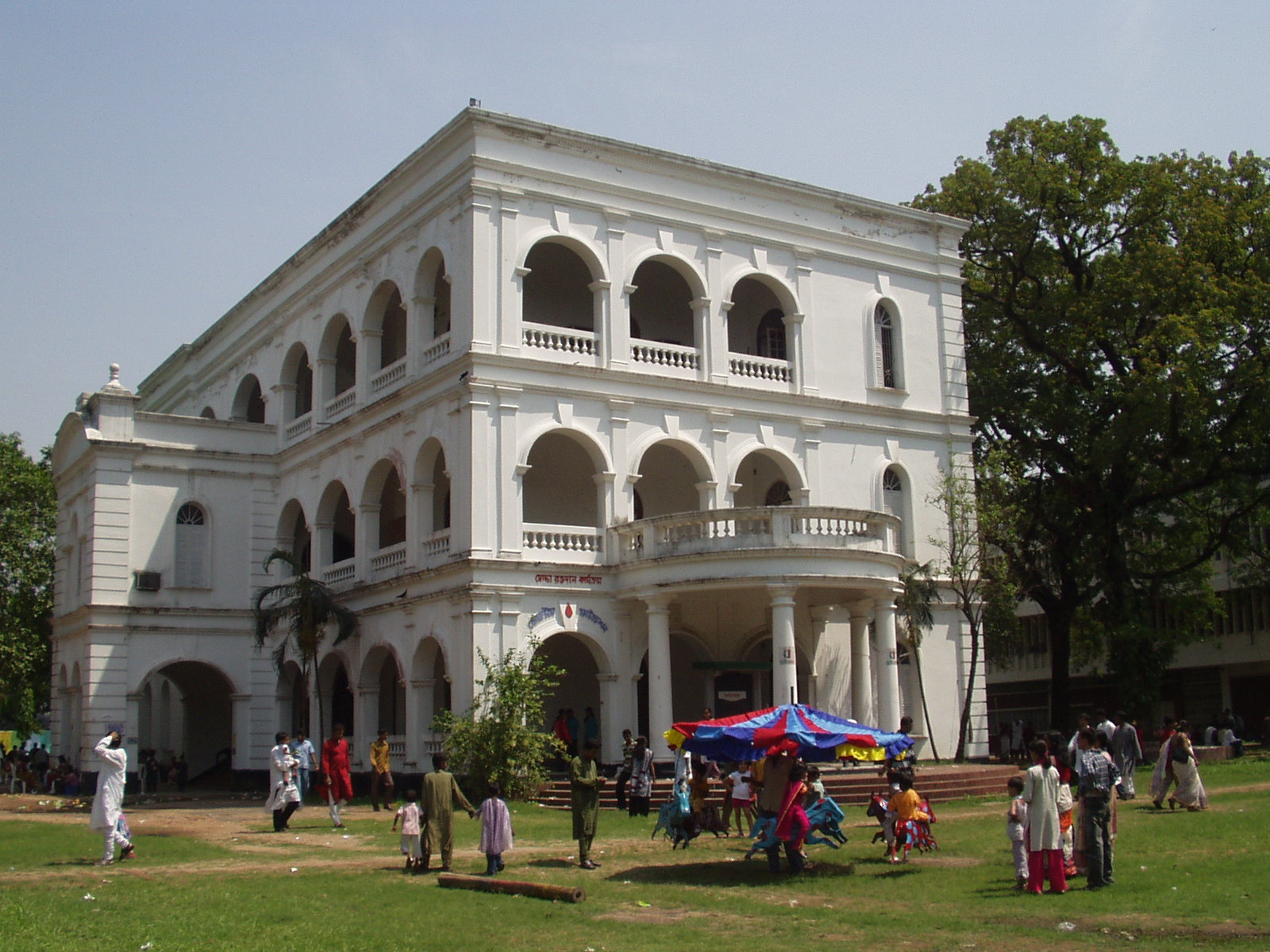
- Burdwan House in 2006
- Former names: Sujatpur Palace

General information
- Type: Museum
- Architectural style: Blend of Mughal and European style
- Location: Kazi Nazrul Islam Avenue, Ramna, Dhaka, Bangladesh
- Coordinates: 23°43′46″N 90°23′50″E
- Completed: 1906 alternatively 1911
- Owner: Bangla Academy

Technical details
- Floor count: 3

Burdwan House also known as Bardhaman House (Bengali: বর্ধমান বাড়ি) is a historic building in Dhaka, Bangladesh. It is currently used as the museum of Bangla Academy. Built in 1906 during the British colonial period, this building, deeply associated with Bangladesh's political, cultural, and language movement history, is a notable example of architecture combining Mughal and European styles. Many prominent figures, including Rabindranath Tagore, Kazi Nazrul Islam, and Sarat Chandra Chattopadhyay, stayed here as guests.

== Etymology ==
Burdwan House was originally known as Sujatpur Palace. It takes its name from the Sujatpur settlement in the Ramna area, one of two communities founded during the tenure of Islam Khan I alongside Mohallah Kishtiyan. The tract now occupied by the Faculty of Arts of University of Dhaka formed part of Sujatpur, hence the palace's original designation. From 1919 to 1924, the Maharaja of Burdwan Bijay Chand Mahtab as a member of the Governor's Executive Council of undivided Bengal, visited Dhaka annually and lodged here as a royal guest. Over time, the building came to be referred to simply as Burdwan House.

== History ==
=== Construction and colonial era ===
Burdwan House was built in 1906 during the British colonial period. After the partition of Bengal in 1905 and Dhaka's elevation to the status of the provincial capital, construction began for residences and offices for high-ranking domestic and foreign government officials along with Old High Court Building, Curzon Hall and others. The building was then two storeys, with staff quarters behind it. In 1911 the partition of Bengal was annulled and Dhaka lost its status as provincial capital. To address the dissatisfaction of the influential Muslim leaders of East Bengal, especially the Nawabs of Dhaka, British government established the University of Dhaka and arranged for the Governor's three executive council members to hold a meeting in Dhaka once a year. To accommodate the three visiting Council members, the government constructed there official residences. Among these, Burdwan house was, according to some sources, built in 1911 for Maharaja of Burdwan. Until 1947, Burdwan House was mainly used as a guest house for high-ranking government officials. From 1919 to 1924, Maharaja Sir Bijay Chand Mahtab of Burdwan as one of the members of the Governor's Executive Council of Bengal visited Dhaka annually and stayed in this house as a royal guest.

On July 1, 1921 University of Dhaka was formal inaugurated in the Ramna area and Burdwan House fell within the university's premises. Consequently, the house served as accommodation for university students and faculty members for a period.

From 1945 onward, the building was used for various cultural events and exhibitions. It continued to serve as a guesthouse until 1947.

=== Chief Minister's residence and language movement ===
From 14 August 1947 to 1954, Burdwan House served as the official residence of the Chief Minister of East Pakistan. The first two Chief Ministers of East Bengal, Khawaja Nazimuddin and Nurul Amin, lived in this house. As a result, all policies and schemes against the public interest of East Bengal were carried out from this Burdwan House. As the Chief Minister's residence, Burdwan House became a significant symbol of the Bengali language movement.

On 5 December 1947, students and teachers of the University of Dhaka marched to this building and demanded that Bengali be made one of the state languages to a meeting of the Muslim League Working Committee. On the evening of 8 January 1948, the leaders of the language movement met with then-Chief Minister Khawaja Nazimuddin at Burdwan House, demanding Bengali as one of the state languages and protesting the arrest and persecution of language movement activists. Again, before the signing of the State Language agreement on 15 March 1948, a meeting was held here between Chief Minister Nazimuddin and the protesting students. On 15 March 1948 at Burdwan House, the eight-point agreement of the State Language Action Council was signed with Khawaja Nazimuddin. On 16 March, a procession marched towards Burdwan House demanding the annulment of the agreement, and during the march police attacked and injured the students.

On 13 January 1948, the East Pakistan Muslim League distributed a booklet titled "East Pakistan's unfortunate public, You must justify our demands" (priced 3 taka) (পূর্ব্ব পাকিস্তানের দুর্ভাগা জনসাধারণ, কৈফিয়ত দিতে হবে আমাদের দাবী) in front of Burdwan House. About 300 people gathered in front of the house interested in meeting with the influential ministers. As they were not permitted to enter the house, the gathering dispersed without any incident. On 30 January 1952, students and the public held a demonstration in front of this building.

During the language movement, the Chief Minister Nurul Amin resided in Burdwan House. The order to fire on the language movement protesters was issued from this building. A written order to fire on the protesters was handed over to the police from Burdwan House in a private car, accompanied by a letter expressing the students' frustration with the limited scope of the investigation and suggesting that a fair investigation might be impossible or willfully obstructed. Thus, Burdwan House as a symbol of power became the focus of public outrage and demands grew for transforming it into a research center for the Bengali language.

=== Post-language movement era ===
To contest the 1954 East Bengal Legislative Assembly election, the United Front coalition was formed. On 17 June 1954, at a public meeting in Paltan Maidan in Dhaka, the United Front announced a 21-point program demanding autonomy for East Pakistan. The 16th of these 21 points was:

"To locate the residence of the chief minister of the United Front at a less costly house, and to convert Burdwan House (a palatial residence once owned by the Maharajas of Burdwan) into a students hostel now, and later, into an institute for research on Bangla language and literature"

— United Front 21-point program

Following the 1954 elections, the United Front won, and the defeated incumbent Chief Minister Nurul Amin left Burdwan House.

After 1954, various cultural programs and exhibitions were organized at Burdwan House. The office of Art Council was opened in here. In 1954, Ustad Allauddin Khan stayed here for several months.

In the third week of April 1954, on the occasion of a literary conference, the language movement painting and photograph exhibition was inaugurated at Burdwan House by shilpacharya Zainul Abedin, with Professor Muhammad Abdul Hye present. In the winter of 1955, a music conference was held on the lawn of Burdwan House in Dhaka. Attending this conference were Ustad Allauddin Khan, artist Quamrul Hassan, Ustad Khadem Hossain Khan, shilpacharya Zainul Abedin, Abbasuddin Ahmed, and author Sarder Jayenuddin, Qazi Motahar Hossain among others.

The offices of the United Nations Development Programme (UNDP) and the United Nations Information Centre were also located here at this time.

=== Establishment of Bangla Academy ===
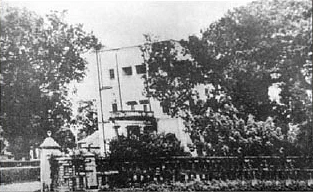
Burdwan House in 1960s

The demand to create a separate institution for research on the Bengali language had arisen long before and this demand gained further momentum as a result of the language movement. In order to fulfill the 21-point program, the Education Minister of the United Front cabinet, Syed Azizul Huq (Nanna Mia), initially instructed to prepare a plan to convert Burdwan House into a research center for the Bengali language. On 3 December 1955, the then Chief Minister Abu Hussain Sarkar inaugurated the Bangla Academy at Burdwan House, fulfilling that promise. On 8 December, Bangla Academy's activities began in the three rooms on the eastern side of the first floor of the building as its first office. In 1958, the entire building came under the ownership of Bangla Academy.

In 1962, respecting the original structure of the house, it was expanded into a three-storied building.

During the Bangladesh Liberation War in 1971, the Culture Department and the folklore collection in this building were damaged due to shelling by the Pakistani army.

=== Cultural activities ===
From 1945 to 1947, the building was used for various cultural events and exhibitions. In 1954, on the occasion of a literary conference, a Language Movement painting and photography exhibition was held at Burdwan House and in 1955, a music conference was held in Dhaka at the premises of Burdwan House. In the early 1950s, young Rafiqun Nabi attended a painting exhibition, held at the Burdwan House by his father.

In 1963, as the first activity of Chhayanaut, at the initiative of Sanjida Khatun, music classes began in several verandas of Burdwan House. During this time, Sanjida Khatun and Farida Bari Malik taught Rabindra Sangeet, Sohrab Hossain taught Nazrul Geeti, Bazlul Karim taught the Tabla, and Ustad Matiur Rahman Khan (Moti Mia) taught violin, sitar, khyal, and ancient Bangla songs. S. M. Ahsan Mushahid was a student during this period. In the same year, the Chhayanaut Music School was established.

Munier Choudhury’s theatre troupe practiced a production of Michael Madhusudan Dutt’s play Krishnakumari at Burdwan House in 1965. However, the play could not be staged due to the then Governor Abdul Monem Khan’s objection to the use of the term "jobon" (Note: "Jobon" or "Yavan" means non-hindu, foreigner, barbaric race. The term originally referred to non-veda-believer. Later it referred to Greeks in the invading army of Alexander. Later it was used as a derogatory term used by upper class Bengali Hindus towards Muslims.) in reference to Muslims.

Artists at Burdwan House
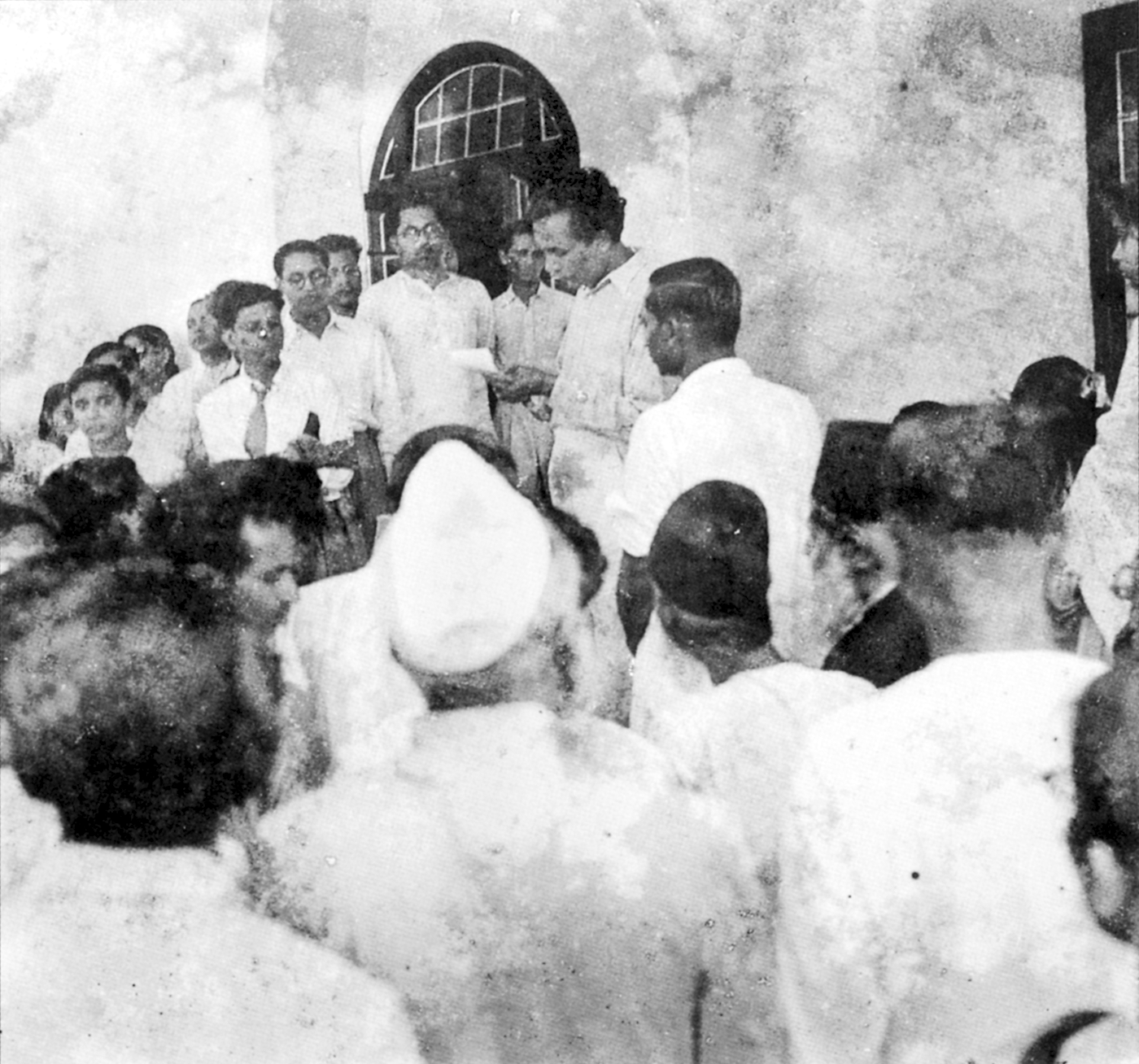
Shilpacharjo Zainul Abedin inaugurating the painting and photograph exhibition in 1954 at Burdwan House, with Professor Muhammad Abdul Hye beside him.

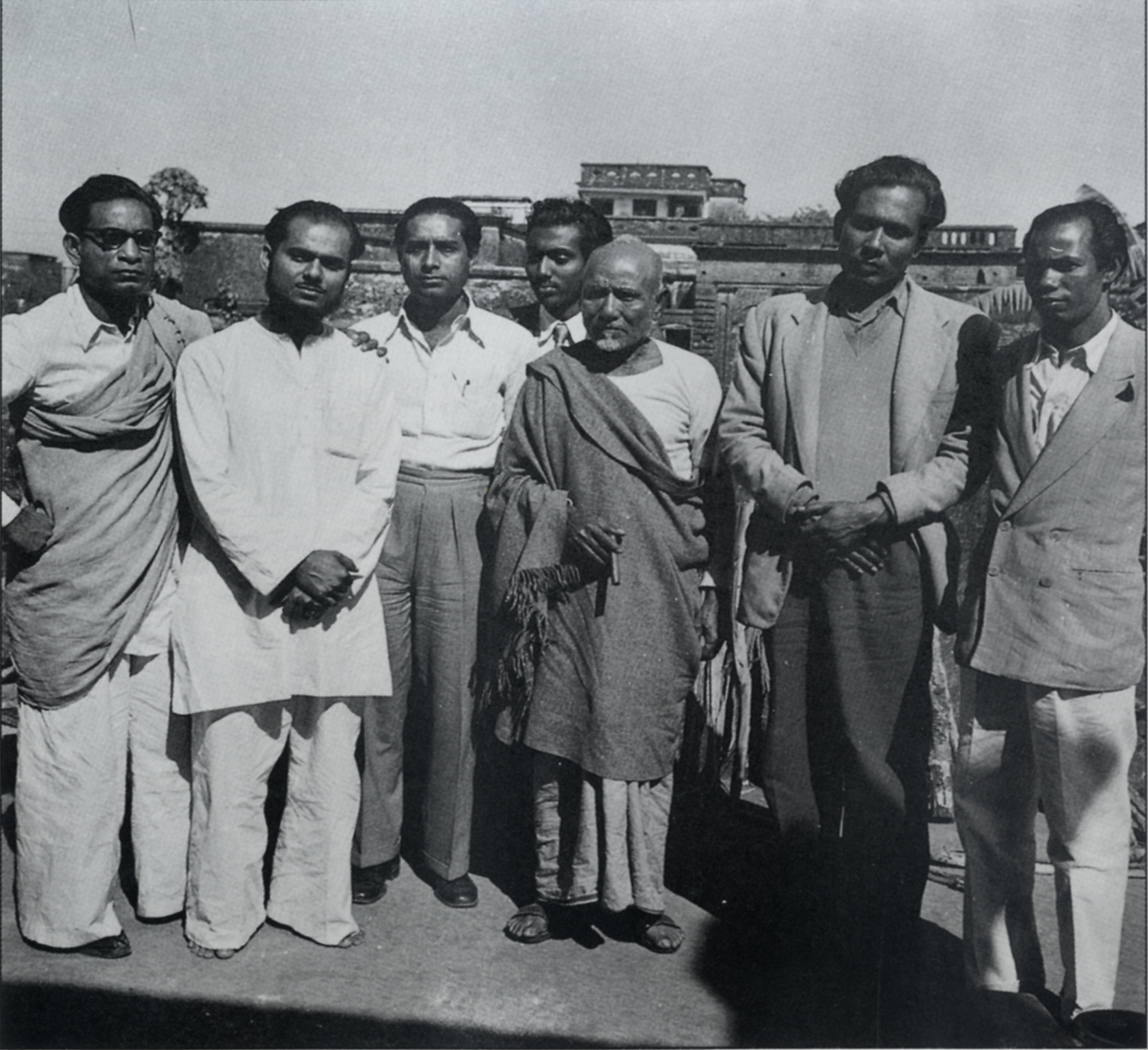
Winter, 1955. In front of Burdwan House Ustad Alauddin Khan with (from left) artist Quamrul Hassan, Ustad Khadem Hossain Khan, Shilpacharya Zainul Abedin, Sarder Jayenuddin and others in the music conference held in Dhaka.

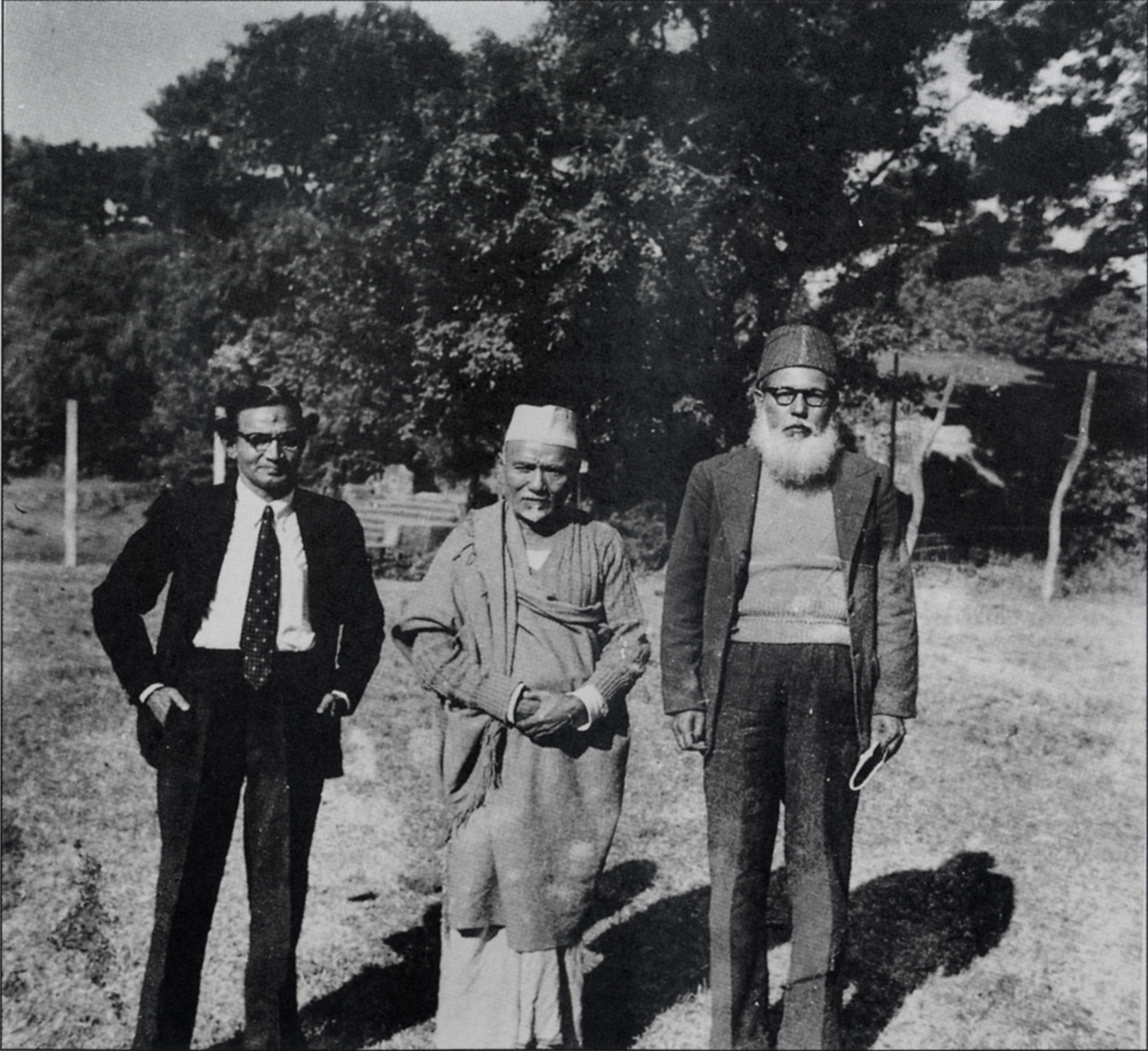
Abbasuddin Ahmed, Ustad Allauddin Khan and Qazi Motahar Hossain in front of the Burdwan house in winter 1955.

== Notable guests and residents ==
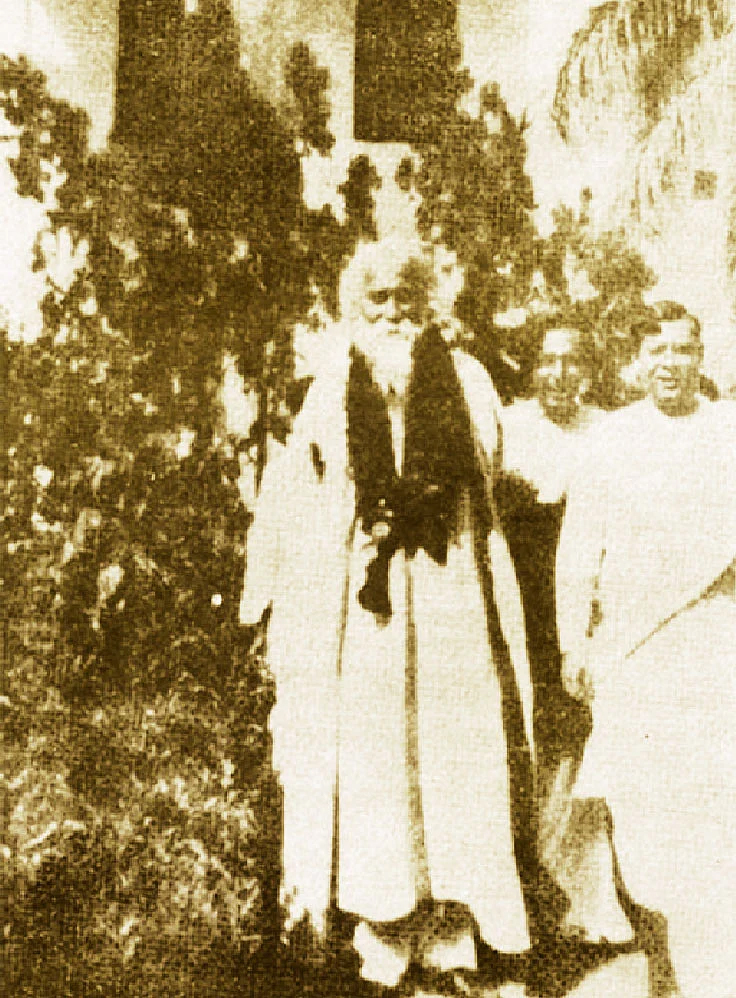
Rabindranath Tagore, R. C. Majumdar and Apurba Chanda in front of Burdwan House on February 10, 1926

Burdwan House was originally constructed as a guest house. During this period, the Maharaja of Burdwan stayed here. Subsequently, when it was repurposed as residential accommodation for the faculty of the University of Dhaka, Professors Ramesh Chandra Majumdar and Qazi Motahar Hossain resided in the building. Eminent literary and cultural figures such as Rabindranath Tagore, Kazi Nazrul Islam, Sarat Chandra Chattopadhya stayed here as their guest. Later, the first two Chief Ministers of East Pakistan also resided here. Over the years, the house has hosted numerous cultural events, welcoming a wide array of distinguished guests. Below is a list and description of these individuals:

Guest / Resident	Year	Position	Description
Rabindranath Tagore	1926	Guest	Rabindranath Tagore visited Dhaka for the 2nd time as a guest of Dhaka University in 1926. The then Vice Chancellor George Harry Langley proposed that Tagore stay in Professor R. C. Majumdar's residence Burdwan House at that time instead of his own home for Bengali hospitality. Tagore stayed for a few days in the western wing of the 2nd floor. R. C. Majumdar later wrote: "In the room of 2nd floor where Rabindranath stayed, there was a mango tree right in front of that room, which was full of blossoms at the time. After morning tea, Rabindranath would sit on the veranda of that room in an easy chair. He would say he enjoyed sitting like that very much. My house's garden had many more trees, and the whole garden was adorned with flowers. There was also a pond in the garden. Overall, he enjoyed this natural beauty." — R. C. Majumdar Burdwan House was then two-storied. The aforementioned mango tree and the pond still exist.
Kazi Nazrul Islam	1928	Guest	In February 1928 poet Kazi Nazrul Islam came to Dhaka for the third time to attend the second annual conference of the Muslim Sahitya-Samaj. During this time he stayed for more than a month in a small room as a guest of Qazi Motahar Hossain on the ground floor of Burdwan House. He taught music to Motahar Hossain's daughter. While returning home around 10 or 11 at night after teaching music to Ranu Shome at Bongram Lane in Tikatuli, Dhaka, Kazi Nazrul Islam was attacked in the dark by a group of 5 to 7 assailants. The attack was allegedly motivated by the fact that as a Muslim he was teaching music to a Hindu girl. Following the incident, he fled to Burdwan House. While staying in this building, the poet would swim in the pond on the west side of the house, bathe, and occasionally sit by the pond's edge playing the flute.
Sarat Chandra Chattopadhyay	1936	Guest	Sarat Chandra Chattopadhyay and Jadunath Sarkar both were invited to receive the honorary degree of Doctor of Letters (D.Litt.) from the University of Dhaka and came to Dhaka in 1936. They stayed at Burdwan House as guests of R. C. Majumdar.
Jadunath Sarkar	1936	Guest	Sarat Chandra Chattopadhyay and Jadunath Sarkar both were invited to receive the honorary degree of Doctor of Letters (D.Litt.) from the University of Dhaka and came to Dhaka in 1936. They stayed at Burdwan House as guests of R. C. Majumdar.
R. C. Majumdar	1921–1936	Resident	In 1921, R. C. Majumdar joined the newly established University of Dhaka as a professor in the History Department. For faculty housing, arrangements were made for him to reside on the second floor of Burdwan House. During this time he hosted many notable guests, including Rabindranath Tagore, Sarat Chandra Chattopadhyay, Jadunath Sarkar and others.
Qazi Motahar Hossain	1921–1936	Resident	As the house tutor of Salimullah Muslim Hall, Qazi Motahar Hossain lived in a part of the ground floor of Burdwan House, and his office was the room on the landing of the stairs to the 2nd floor on the left. The rebel poet Kazi Nazrul Islam stayed here for a month invited by him as a guest.
Bijay Chand Mahtab	1919, 1920, 1921, 1922, 1923, 1924	Guest	From 1919 to 1924, Sir Bijay Chand Mahtab, the Maharaja of Burdwan and a member of the Governor's Executive Council of undivided Bengal, came to Dhaka once a year. He stayed in this house at that time as a royal guest.
Khawaja Nazimuddin	1947–1948	Resident	As the first Chief Minister of East Pakistan, he lived in the official residence of chief minister Burdwan House from 1947 to 1948. On 8 January 1948, language movement leaders met with the Chief Minister at Burdwan House. Again, before the signing of the State Language agreement on 15 March 1948, he held meetings here with students demanding Bengali as one of the state languages.
Nurul Amin	1948–1954	Resident	As the second Chief Minister of East Pakistan, he lived in Burdwan House from 1948 to 1954. During the 1952 language movement, he ordered the firing on protesters from this building.
Ustad Allauddin Khan	1954	Resident	Ustad Allauddin Khan lived here for several months in 1954.In winter 1955, he participated in a music conference held in the premises of Burdwan House in Dhaka.
Abu Hussain Sarkar	1955	Inaugurator	On 3 December 1955, then Chief Minister Abu Hussain Sarkar inaugurated the Bangla Academy at Burdwan House as part of implementing the United Front's 21-point program.
Muhammad Abdul Hye	1954	Inaugurator	In the third week of April 1954, during a literary conference at Burdwan House, Professor Muhammad Abdul Hye was present to inaugurate of language movement painting and photograph exhibition.
Zainul Abedin	1954, 1955	Inaugurator, cultural attendee	In the third week of April 1954, on the occasion of a literary conference, the language movement painting and photograph exhibition was inaugurated at Burdwan House by shilpacharya Zainul Abedin. At the winter 1955 music conference on the grounds of Burdwan House Zainul Abedin was in attendance.
Quamrul Hassan	1955	Cultural attendee	In the winter of 1955, a music conference was held on the lawn of Burdwan House in Dhaka attended by them.
Ustad Khadem Hossain Khan	1955	Cultural attendee	In the winter of 1955, a music conference was held on the lawn of Burdwan House in Dhaka attended by them.
Sarder Jayenuddin	1955	Cultural attendee	In the winter of 1955, a music conference was held on the lawn of Burdwan House in Dhaka attended by them.
Abbasuddin Ahmed	1955	Cultural attendee	In the winter of 1955, a music conference was held on the lawn of Burdwan House in Dhaka attended by them.
Rafiqun Nabi	1950s	Cultural attendee	In the early 1950s, young Rafiqun Nabi attended a painting exhibition, held at the Burdwan House his father.
Munier Choudhury	1965	Cultural engagement	Munier Choudhury's theater troupe rehearsed Michael Madhusudan Dutt’s Krishnakumari at Burdwan House in 1965, but the play was not staged due to the then Governor Abdul Monem Khan's objection to the use of the term "Jobon".
Dr. Muhammad Shahidullah	During their work at Bangla Academy	Staff	Worked at Burdwan House in Bangla Academy on research and administrative duties.
Mohammad Barkatullah	During their work at Bangla Academy	Staff	Worked at Burdwan House in Bangla Academy on research and administrative duties.
Dr. Muhammad Enamul Haq	During their work at Bangla Academy	Staff	Worked at Burdwan House in Bangla Academy on research and administrative duties.
Prof. Syed Ali Ahsan	During their work at Bangla Academy	Staff	Worked at Burdwan House in Bangla Academy on research and administrative duties.
Dr. Kazi Din Muhammad	During their work at Bangla Academy	Staff	Worked at Burdwan House in Bangla Academy on research and administrative duties.
Prof. Kabir Chowdhury	During their work at Bangla Academy	Staff	Worked at Burdwan House in Bangla Academy on research and administrative duties.
Sardar Fazlul Karim	During their work at Bangla Academy	Staff	Worked at Burdwan House in Bangla Academy on research and administrative duties.
Abu Jafar Shamsuddin	During their work at Bangla Academy	Staff	Worked at Burdwan House in Bangla Academy on research and administrative duties.
Dr. Mazharul Islam	During their work at Bangla Academy	Staff	Worked at Burdwan House in Bangla Academy on research and administrative duties.
Sanjida Khatun	1963	Cultural engagement	In 1963, as part of Chhayanaut's activities, music classes were initiated for the first time on several verandas of Burdwan House under the initiative of Sanjida Khatun. During this period, Sanjida Khatun along with Farida Bari Malik taught Rabindra Sangeet.
Farida Bari Malik	1963	Cultural engagement	Farida Bari Malik was renowned Rabindra Sangeet singer of that time. In 1963, as part of Chhayanaut’s activities, Farida Bari Malik, along with Sanjida Khatun, taught Rabindra Sangeet on several verandas of Burdwan House.
Sohrab Hossain	1963	Cultural engagement	In 1963, as part of Chhayanaut's activities, Sohrab Hossain taught Nazrul Geeti on several verandas of Burdwan House.
Bazlul Karim	1963	Cultural engagement	In 1963, as part of Chhayanaut's activities, Bazlul Karim taught tabla on several verandas of Burdwan House.
Ustad Matiur Rahman Khan (Moti Mia)	1963	Cultural engagement	In 1963, as part of Chhayanaut's activities, Ustad Matiur Rahman Khan (Moti Mia) taught violin, sitar, khyal, and ancient Bangla songs on several verandas of Burdwan House.
S. M. Ahsan Mushahid	1963	Cultural engagement	In 1963, S. M. Ahsan Mushahid was one of the students of Chhayanaut.
Sheikh Hasina	2010, 2011	Inaugurator	Prime Minister Sheikh Hasina visited Burdwan House on 1 February 2010 to inaugurate the Language Movement Museum, and on 1 February 2011 to inaugurate the National Literature and Writers' Museum.
Amartya Sen	2011	Inaugurator	Nobel laureate in Economics Amartya Sen was present during the inauguration of the National Literature and Writers' Museum at Burdwan House on 1 February 2011.

== Architecture ==
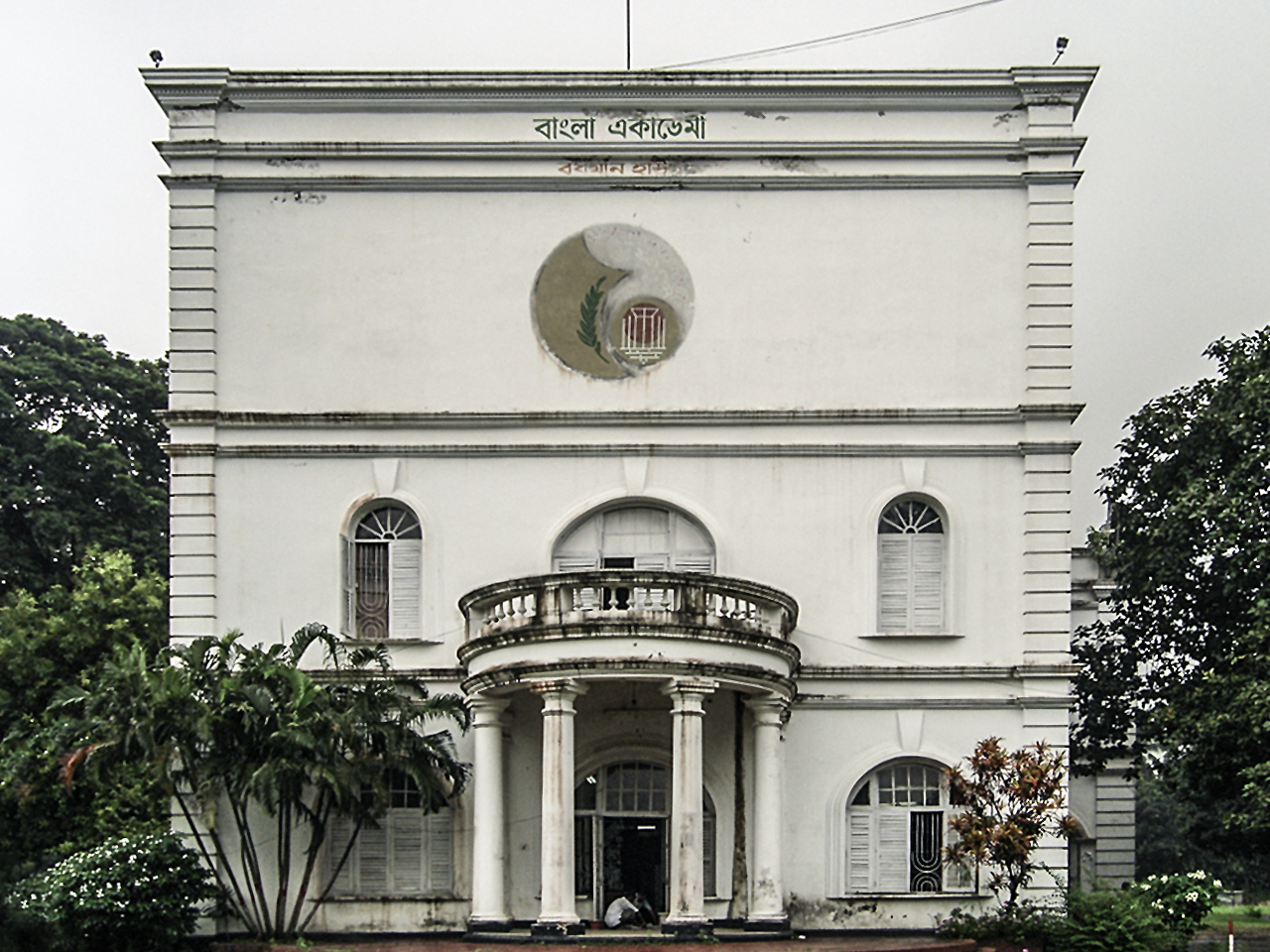
Front side of Burdwan House

Burdwan House is constructed of brick and painted white. The building exhibits traces of Victorian-style architecture. Its design is a blend of Mughal and European architectural styles, and it is an example of colonial architecture from 19th century India. The main structure of Burdwan House is rectangular and had two stories. Due to renovations over time, much of its original form has been lost. In 1962, a third floor was added, following the building's original design.

Currently, in front of the main entrance on the east side, there is a broad semicircular carriage veranda (Note: Similar to side corridor of a train carriage.) with stairs. Near it on the west side is another separate semicircular veranda with stairs. These verandas are supported by equally spaced sturdy columns. On the 2nd story, these two verandas have a high-quality baluster so that morning and evening sun could be enjoyed from them. In the newly added third floor section, there are no such verandas, but it is open to the north, facing the road. A long, wide open veranda runs across both the east and west sides on all three floors. This verandas provides separate access to each room of Burdwan House. The arches throughout the building are semicircular.

Currently, inside the continuous veranda in front of the main entrance there is a glass chamber resembling a gallery, in which a sculpture of a freedom fighter with a rifle is placed, symbolizing the period from the language movement through Bangladesh's liberation war. On the west side of the building there is a pond, and also a mango tree. Behind these were once employee quarters.

Near the main entrance is a mahogany wooden staircase leading to the second floor, with finely crafted cast-iron guard rail. The staircase to the third floor is also made of wood. A fireplace and other amenities once existed on the second floor.

Originally, the wooden doors and windows of the building had colonial-style fretwork, examples of which still exist. Initially, they were all single-leaf wooden doors and windows. Later, for security, an additional wooden and glass door was installed inside each of these. In the upper portions of almost all windows, oriel windows in the Greco-Roman European style can be seen, allowing light and air to enter.

On the south side of the ground floor of Burdwan House, parts of the floor and walls of one room are covered with valuable wood. It is believed that this room was the house's dance ballroom. On the east side of the second floor, a puja room can be seen.

Architecture of Bardhaman House
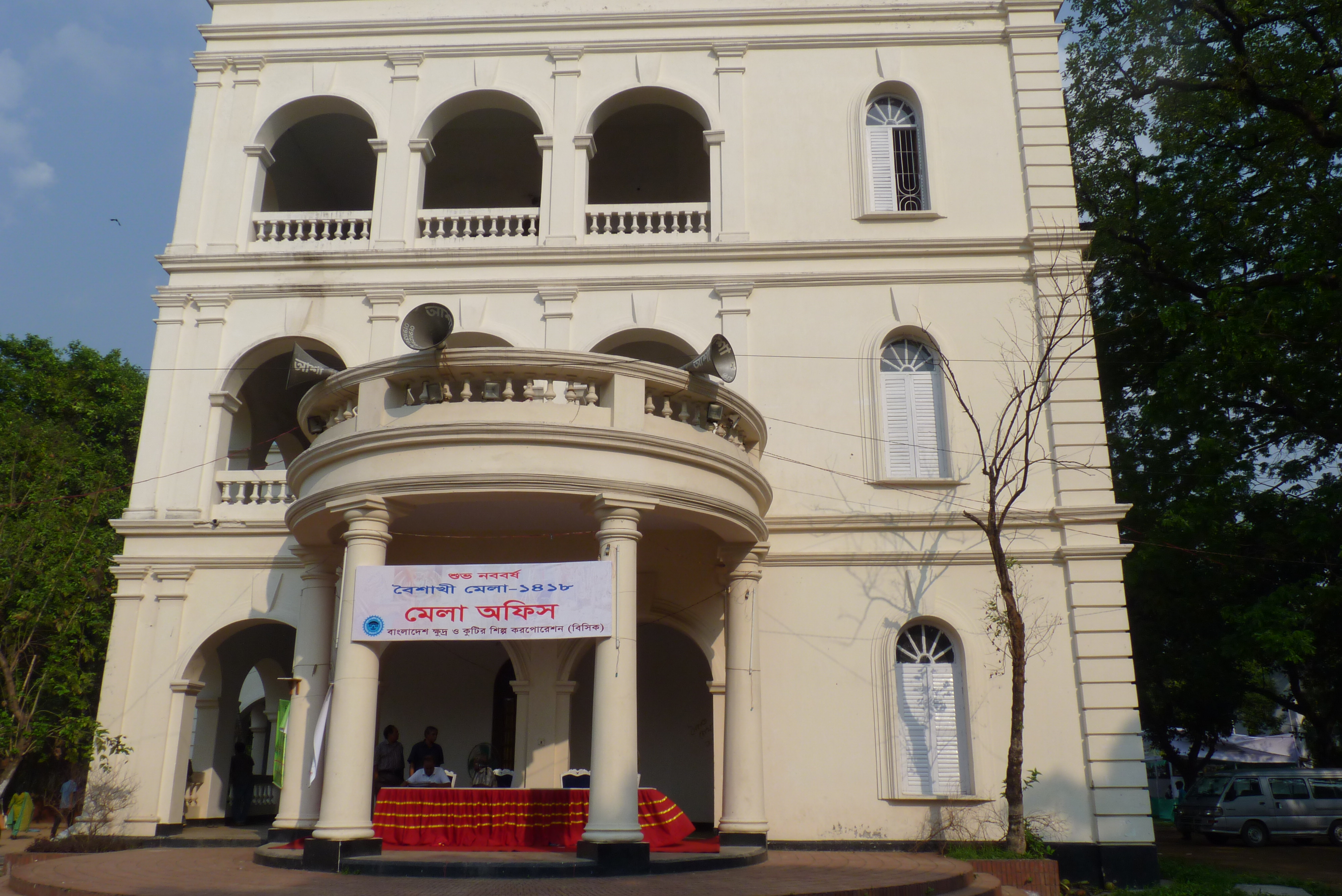
The broad semicircular carriage veranda with stairs in front of Burdwan House.

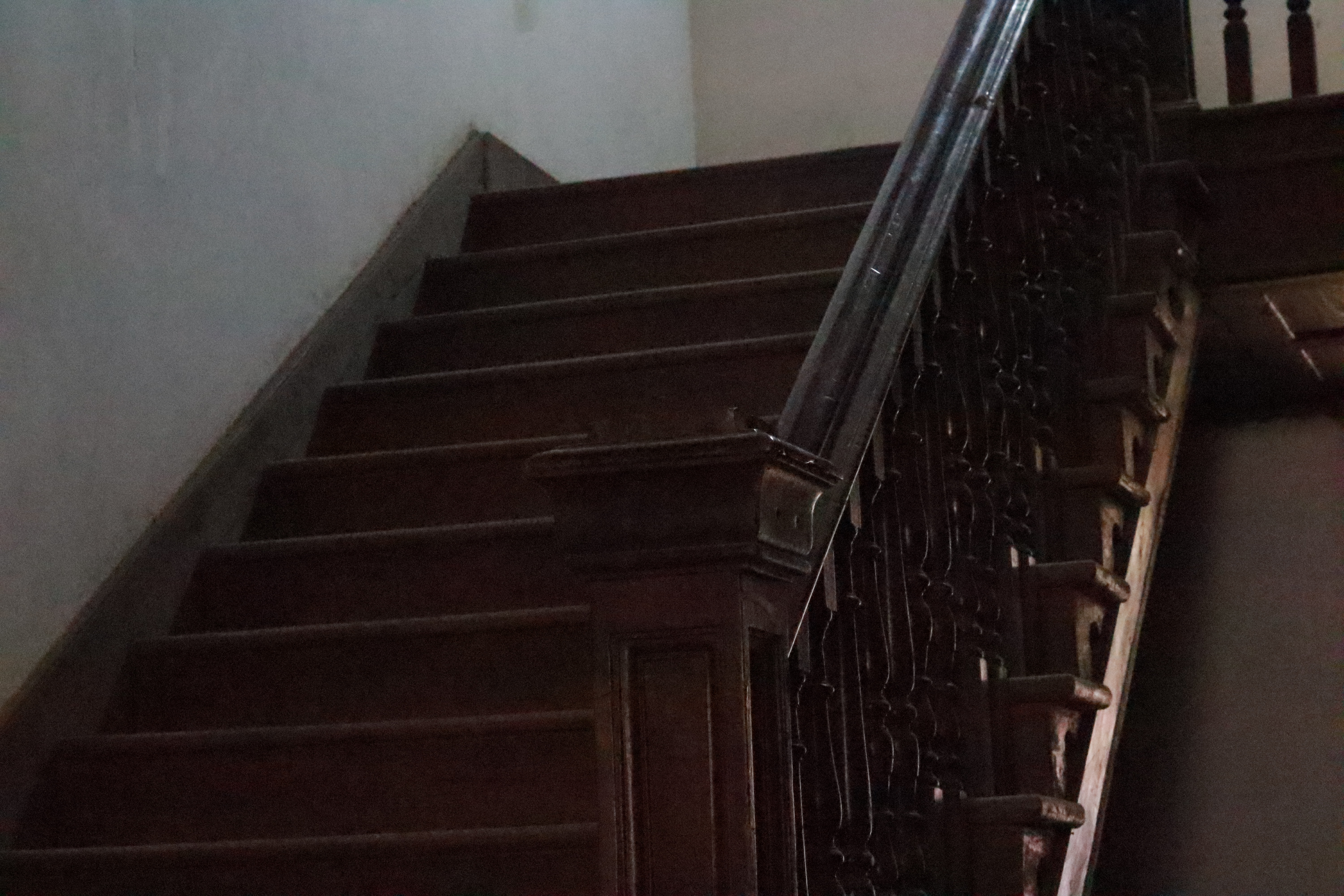
The mahogany wooden staircase of Burdwan House.

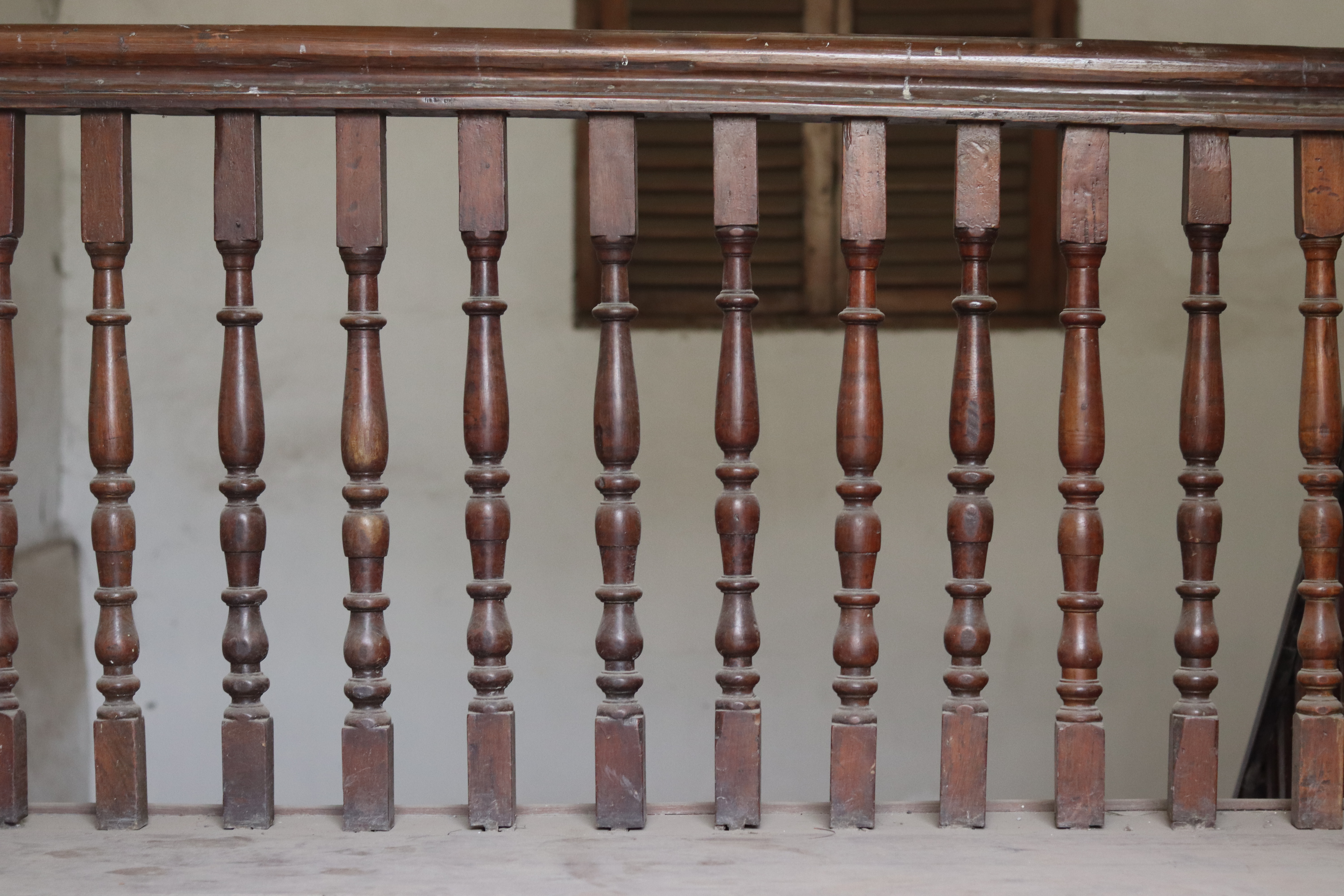
The craftsmanship of the mahogany wooden staircase at Burdwan House.

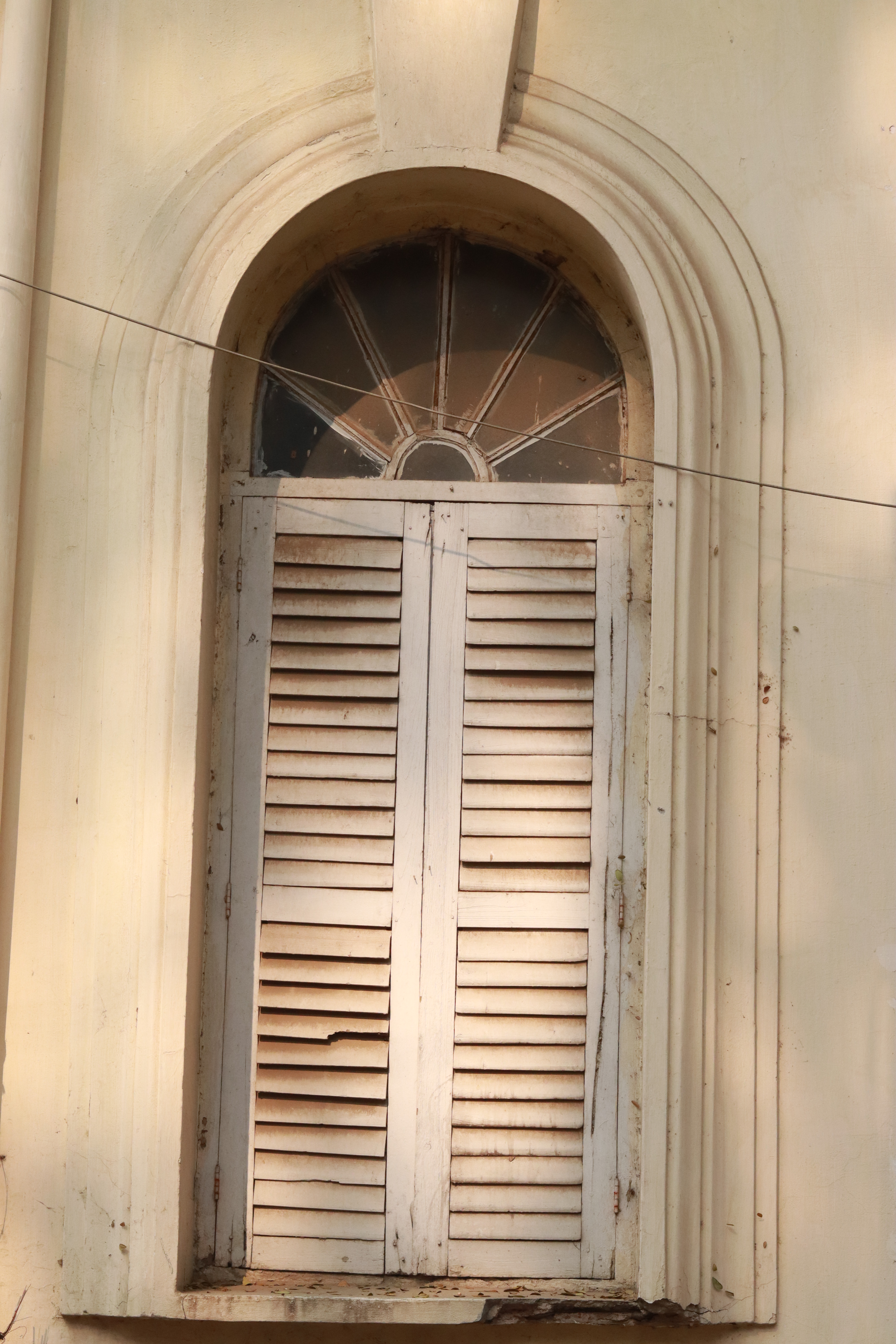
The Greco-Roman style oriel windows of Burdwan House.

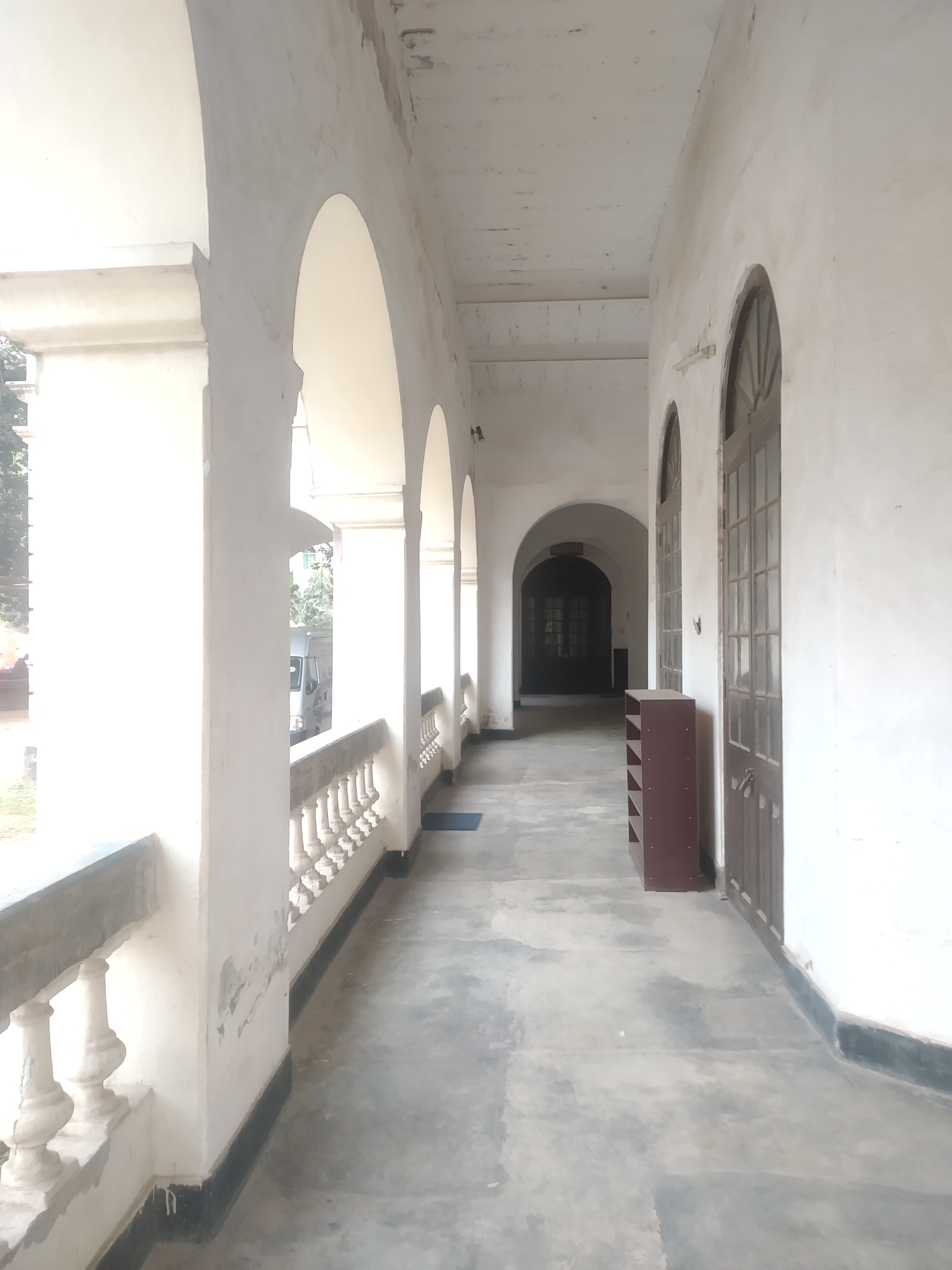
Hallway of Burdwan House.

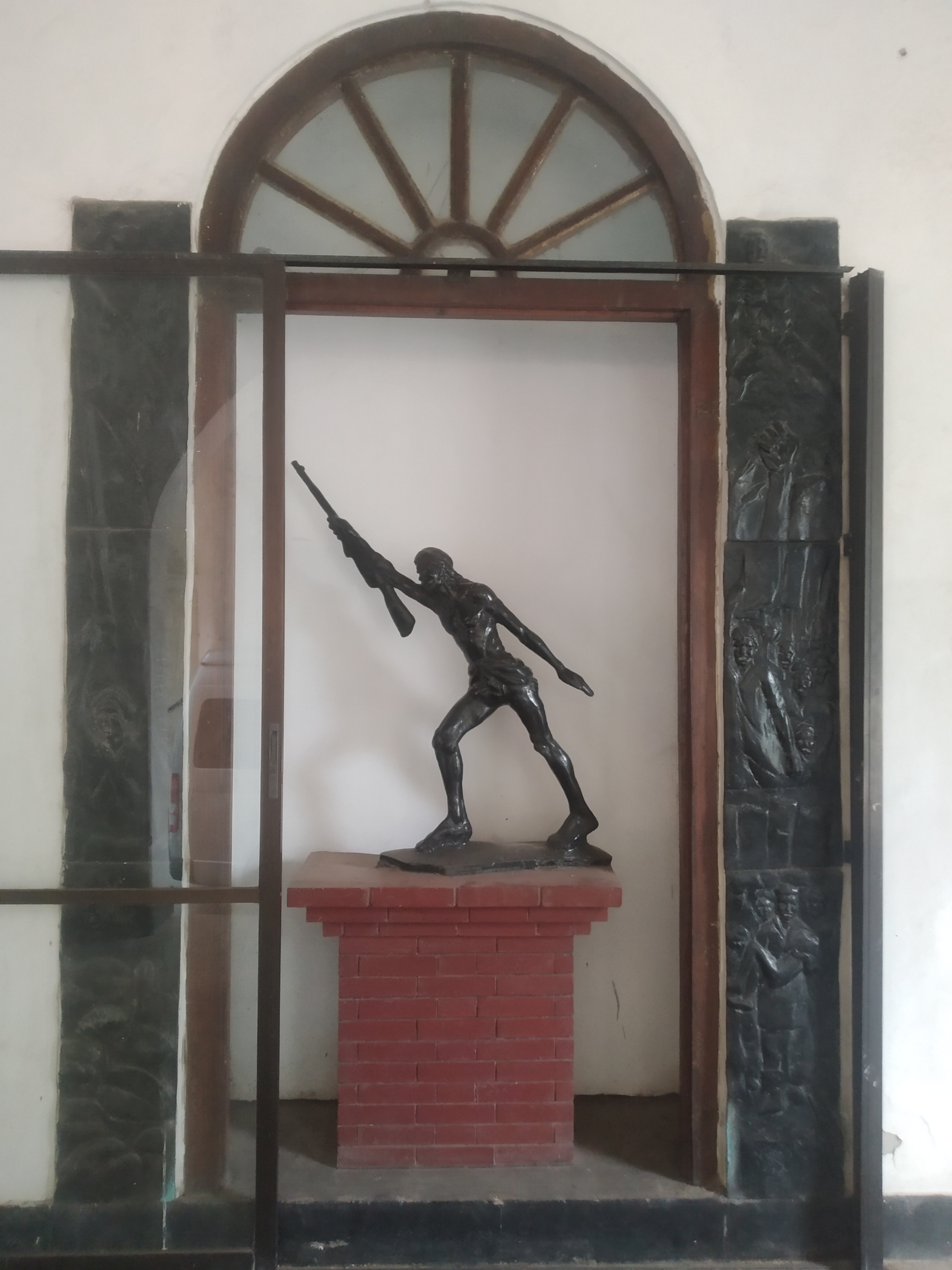
A freedom fighter sculpture with a rifle inside a glass chamber behind a colonial-style door.

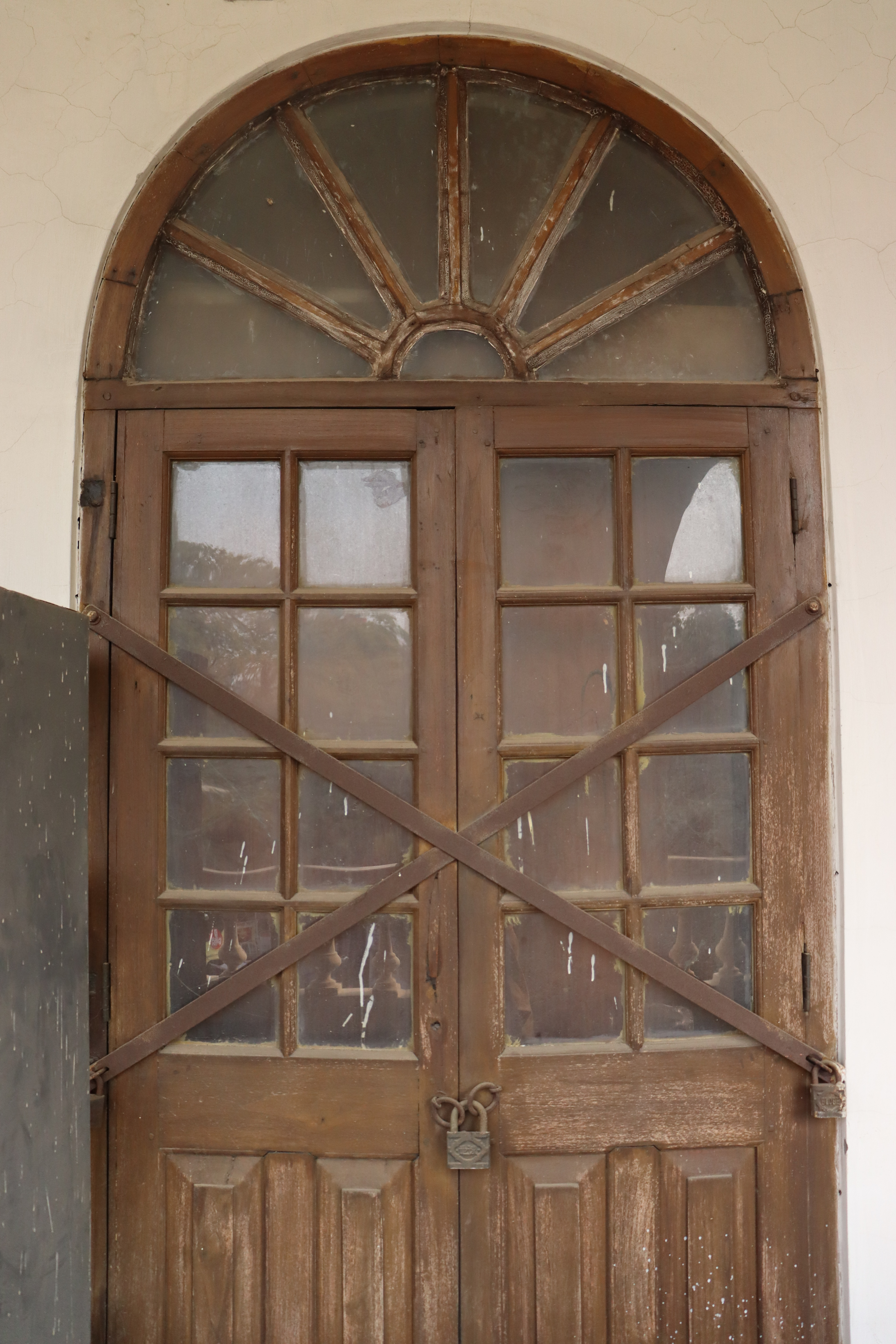
Colonial-style wooden door of Burdwan House.

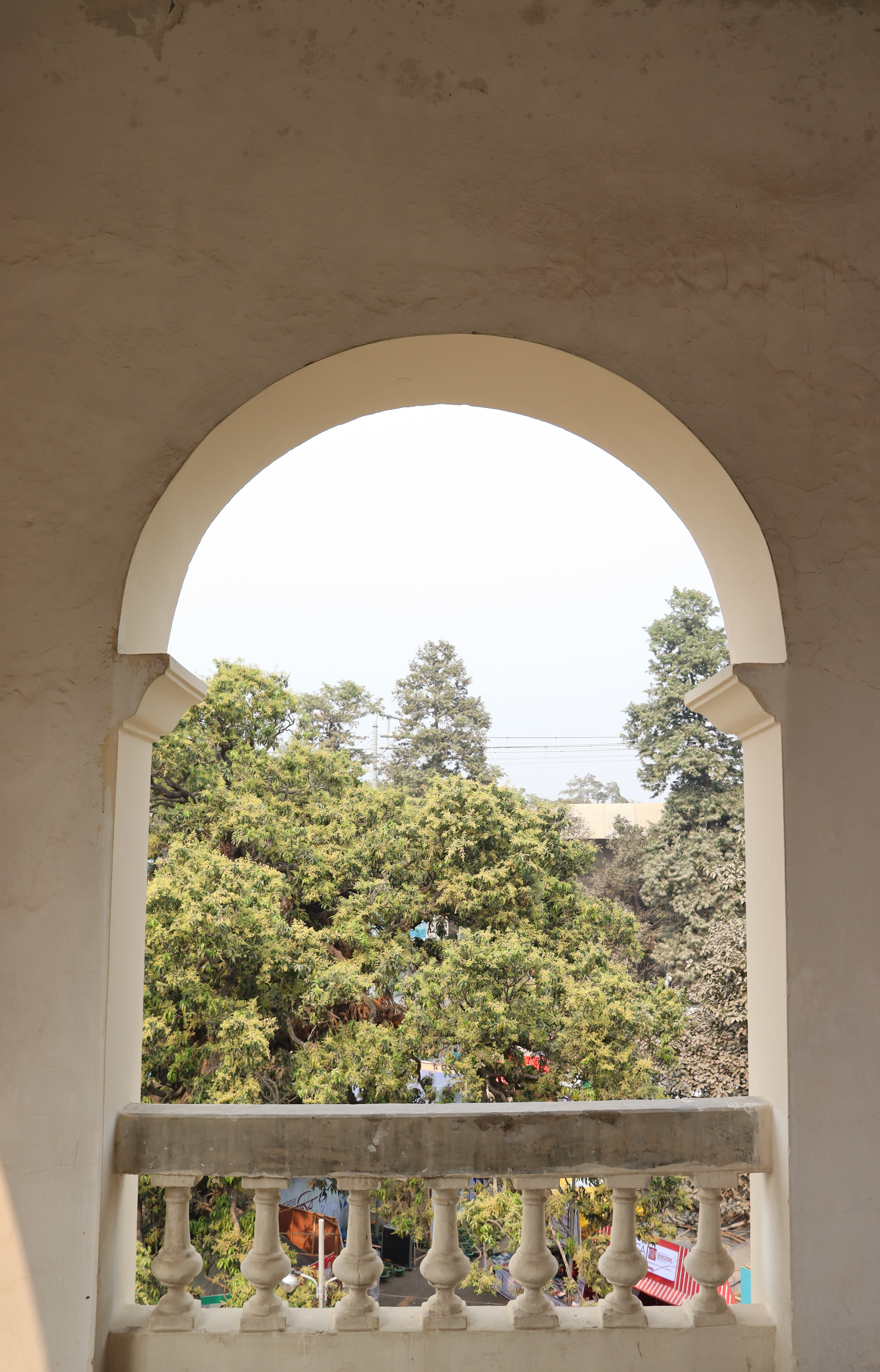
The arches of Burdwan House.

== Current use ==
Since 1978, each year in the entire month of February Bangla Academy organizes Ekushey Book Fair around Burdwan House.

Although no official work is conducted here now, Burdwan House stands as a symbol of the Bangla Academy. As of July 2025, the layout of Burdwan House is:

- On the ground floor:
  - National Literature and Writers' Museum
  - Bangla Academy Museum and Archives Division
  - Bangla Academy Sub-Post Office
- On the second floor:
  - Language Movement Museum
  - Shahidullah Research Room
  - Nazrul Memorial Room
  - Manuscript Repository
  - Bangladesh Shilpi Kollan Trust (temporary office)
- On the third floor:
  - Folk Heritage Museum
  - Bangla Academy Archives
Museums at Bardhaman House
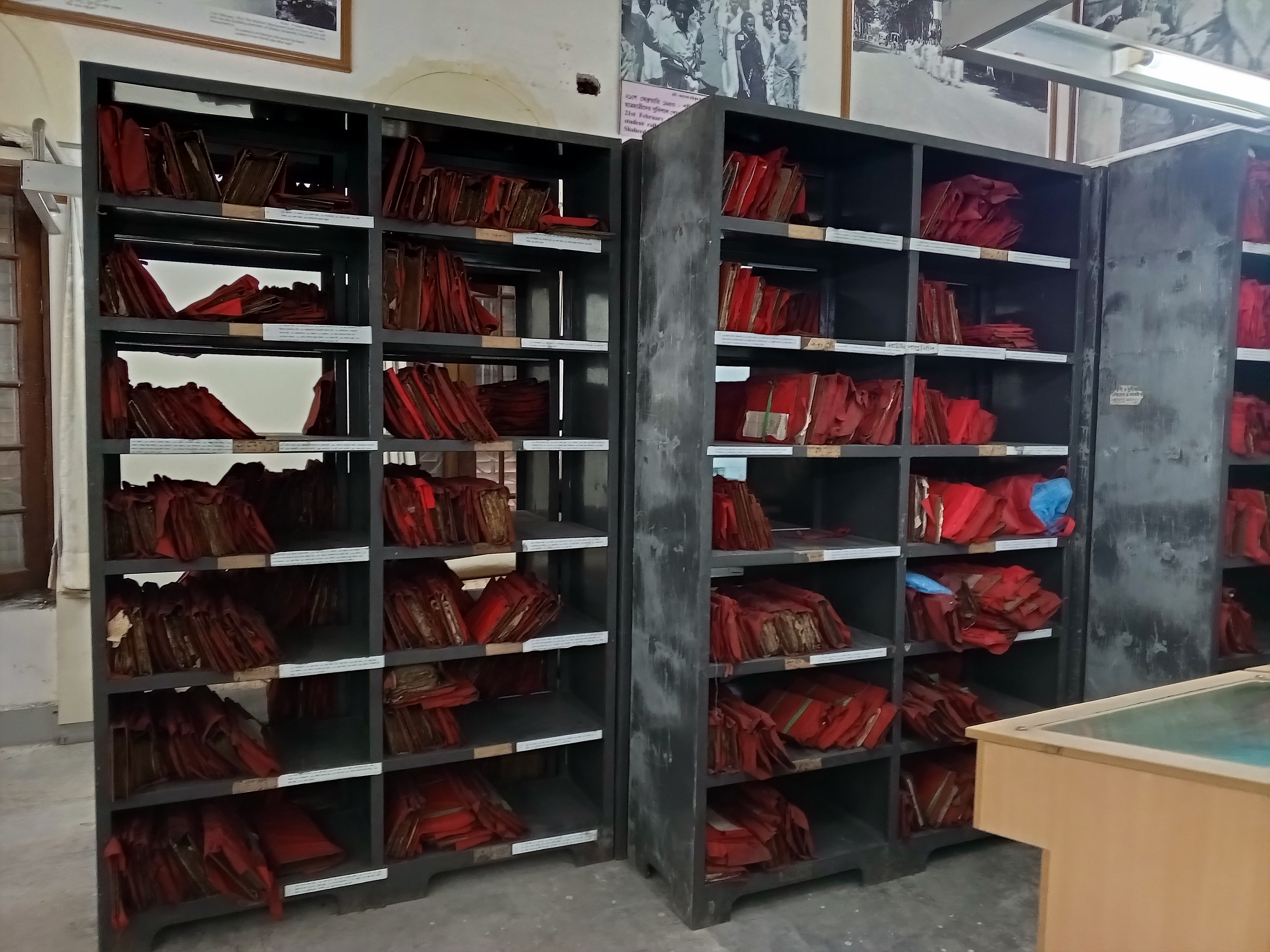
Manuscript Repository Room.

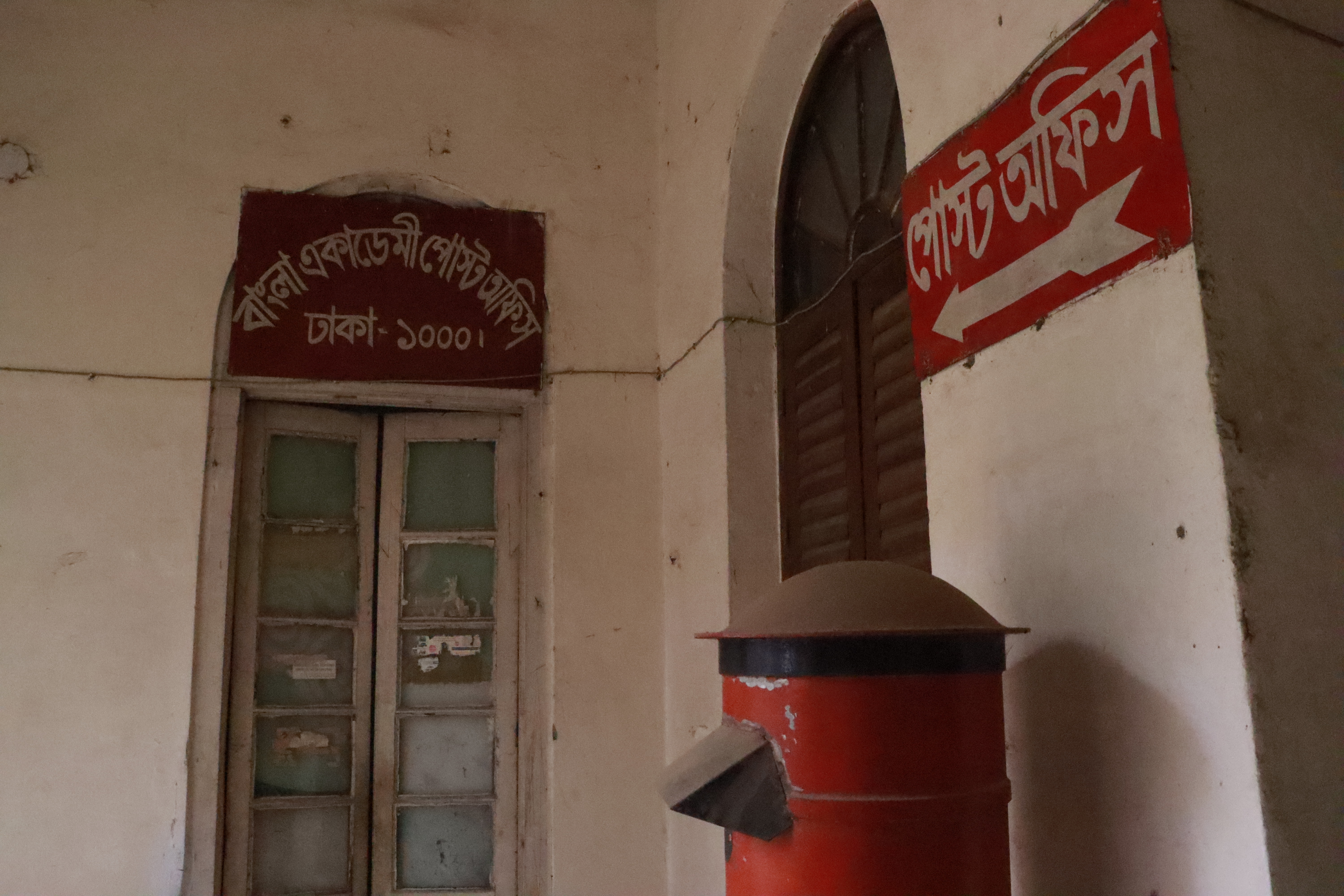
Bangla Academy Sub-Post Office.

=== National Literature and Writers' Museum ===
The National Literary and Writers’ Museum is housed in six ground-floor rooms of Bangla Academy Burdwan House. On 1 February 2011, the then Prime Minister of Bangladesh, Sheikh Hasina, officially inaugurated the museum in four of these rooms. Nobel Laureate economist Professor Amartya Sen was present at the inauguration ceremony.

The museum exhibits the history and evolution of the Bengali language and literature, along with portraits of renowned writers and poets, their personal belongings, handwritten manuscripts, and various literary works. Notable exhibits include portraits and memorabilia related to literary and cultural icons such as Rabindranath Tagore, Kazi Nazrul Islam, Mir Mosharraf Hossain, Dr. Muhammad Shahidullah, Ishwar Chandra Vidyasagar, Lalon, Hason Raja, Jasimuddin, Sukanta Bhattacharya, Michael Madhusudan Dutt, Shamsur Rahman, and Sufia Kamal among others.

In the first room of the National Literature and Writers' Museum, pictures of the origin of the Bengali language, a map of the journey of the proto-languages, the Bengali language family, and the origin and evolution of the Bengali script are presented. On the upper walls of the room, large wooden frames display the evolution of Bengali vowels, consonants, and numerals. Below these are facsimiles of original stone inscriptions and copperplate inscriptions. The progression from the earliest Bengali script to the modern Bengali script is shown. This room also exhibits an example of Bengali manuscript Shreekrishna Kirtan.The room also contains hand writings of Mir Mosharraf Hossain; poet Shamsur Rahman's spectacles, wallet, wristwatch, and notebook; and some personal memorabilia of poet Sufia Kamal.

The second room exhibits artifacts related to poet Rabindranath Tagore, Sher-e-Bangla A. K. Fazlul Huq, national poet Kazi Nazrul Islam, Jasimuddin, Sheikh Mujibur Rahman, and Sufia Kamal. It is filled with exhibits of Rabindranath Tagore and Kazi Nazrul Islam. In a section of the room, many photographs of Rabindranath Tagore are displayed above and below: as a boy, in youth, bedridden, practicing music, acting, writing, painting, with world-famous personalities, and in various countries of the East and West. The room also includes a reproduction of Tagore's Nobel Prize certificate and medal, the news article of his Nobel Prize in the 15 November 1913 issue of The Statesman, a page of the manuscript of his poetry collection Manasi, and a page of the manuscript of his novel Gora. In one corner of the room are displayed an illustrated poem by Tagore and its translation, along with manuscripts of various other poems by him. On the other side, there are exhibits of Kazi Nazrul Islam's literary works, his handwritten notes, and photographs of him at various ages. Among them is a page of the magazine Dhumketu edited by Nazrul (dated 12th Bhadra 1329 Bengali calendar, i.e. 29 August 1922 CE) and a page of the magazine Langal edited by Manabhusan Mukhopadhyay (dated 23 December 1925).

Exhibits of Sukanta Bhattacharya, Jibanananda Das, Muhammad Shahidullah, Buddhadeva Bose, Shamsur Rahman (poet), and Sufia Kamal are in the third room. It contains Sukanta Bhattacharya's handwritten poem Konvoy and his photographs; photographs of Jibanananda Das (with his wife) and his handwritten poem; a photograph of Muhammad Shahidullah and a letter addressed to him by Rabindranath Tagore; a handwritten letter from Buddhadeva Bose to his daughter Minakshi; and Buddhadeva Bose's poem Jaoa Asha. Also displayed is a group photo of the "Dhaka Young Writers' Circle" featuring Jagadish Ghosh, Buddhadeva Bose, Amalendra Bose, Parimal Roy, and Ajit Dutta. A color photograph of poet Sufia Kamal and a copy of one of her poems are here as well, along with a poster of national poet Kazi Nazrul Islam. Two large color photographs commemorating the centenary of Kazi Nazrul Islam are displayed. In one corner of the room are a photograph of Sheikh Mujibur Rahman among writers on the Bangla Academy grounds, a photograph of Sheikh Mujibur Rahman delivering a speech on 21st February, and a photograph of Bangabandhu with the Nazrul family.

The fourth room features a portrait of Raja Ram Mohan Roy and a photograph of his London residence with the inscription "Indian scholar and reformer lived here." It also displays a handwritten letter from Ishwar Chandra Vidyasagar to Tarakanta Bandyopadhyay in Kashi (Varanasi) proving Vidyasagar's monthly donation, and Rabindranath Tagore's handwritten comment about Vidyasagar. Additionally, six sonnets written by Michael Madhusudan Dutt in his own hand are exhibited here (he wrote one of them in Dhaka). There are also a photograph of Michael Madhusudan Dutt and a photograph of his tomb. Furthermore, portraits, documents, and information about Bankim Chandra Chatterjee, Mir Mosharraf Hossain, Abdul Karim Sahitya Bisharad, Bibhutibhushan Bandyopadhyay, Dinabandhu Mitra, Sarat Chandra Chattopadhyay, Lalon, and Hason Raja are presented in this room. This room also displays some verses from the ancient Buddhist mystical songs Charyapada, which is the earliest extant example of the Bengali language.

In 2012, the National Literature and Writers' Museum was expanded with two more rooms. In the first of these new rooms are exhibits related to Ishwar Chandra Gupta, Nabinchandra Sen, Peary Chand Mitra, Akshay Kumar Maitreya, Hara Prasad Shastri, Dinesh Chandra Sen, Kaykobad, Ramendra Sundar Tribedi, Pramatha Chaudhuri, and Satyendranath Dutta. Also featured are Ismail Hossain Siraji, Maniruzzaman Islamabadi, Farrukh Ahmad, Nawab Faizunnesa, Begum Rokeya, Shamsunnahar Mahmud, Syed Mujtaba Ali, Syed Waliullah, and Rashid Karim. One panel in the room is dedicated to five poets – Rabindranath Tagore, Rajanikanta Sen, Dwijendralal Ray, Atul Prasad Sen, and Kazi Nazrul Islam – highlighting each poet's unique characteristics. Another panel presents leading figures of the Muslim Sahitya-Samaj established in Dhaka: Kazi Abdul Wadud, Abul Hussain, Qazi Motahar Hossain, Abul Fazal, and Abdul Quadir. This room also highlights the institutional role of Bangla Academy in the development of the Bengali language, literature, and culture.

The National Literature and Writers' Museum is open every day except government holidays from 11:00 am to 1:00 pm and from 2:30 pm to 4:00 pm.

=== Language Movement Museum ===
On the east side of the second floor of Bangla Academy's Burdwan House, four rooms have been set up as the Language Movement Museum. The then Prime Minister Sheikh Hasina inaugurated the Language Movement Museum on 1 February 2010.

The museum's exhibits include book covers, photographs, and other materials related to the history, background, and events of the language movement; the cover of the booklet Pakistaner Rashtra Bhasha: Bangla Na Urdu?; excerpts from various writings on the language movement; historical photographs of the language movement; and contemporary newspaper reports about the movement. Also displayed are lines from Nur Nama by the medieval poet Abdul Hakim; poems on the Bengali language by Ishwar Chandra Gupta, Michael Madhusudan Dutt, and Atul Prasad Sen; the original design of the Central Shaheed Minar drawn in 1956 by Hamidur Rahman; a photograph of the laying of the foundation of the present Shaheed Minar; Dhirendranath Datta, the first proponent of Bengali as one of the state languages; linguist Dr. Muhammad Shahidullah; photographs of Rabindranath Tagore; special issues of newspapers from the time; images of protesting students on the Arts Faculty grounds of Dhaka University prepared to break Section 144; student processions; a photograph of student leader Shawkat Ali injured by police batons during a strike being carried by Sheikh Mujibur Rahman in a rickshaw to a hospital; and many other rare photographs, including the Shaheed Minar constructed by Eden Mohila College students.

In one room are displayed the coat worn by language martyr Shafiur Rahman and some of his family's photographs; a school certificate of martyr Abul Barkat and his Ekushey Padak award certificate; and related items. Also on display is Rabindranath Tagore's writing from Bengali year 1354 (1948 CE) on the history of Bengali Muslims’ conflict over the Bengali language. Additionally, the museum holds a handwritten copy of Mahbub Ul Alam Choudhury's poem "Kandte Ashini, Fasir Dabi Niye Eshechi", poet Alauddin Al-Azad's handwritten poem "Smriti Sthambha" in protest of the 26 February 1952 destruction of the Shaheed Minar, and the first song composed about the language movement.

The Language Movement Museum is open every day except government holidays from 11:00 am to 1:00 pm and from 2:30 pm to 4:00 pm.

=== Folk Heritage Museum ===
The Folk Heritage Museum is located on the west side of the third floor of Burdwan House. After the establishment of the Bangla Academy, as much emphasis was placed on collecting folklore materials as on gathering folk crafts. Various elements of folk art were collected and initially displayed in a room on the second floor of the Old Press building as the Folklore Collection. Researchers and enthusiasts of folklore and folk art, both domestic and foreign, have used these collections for information. Later, the Folklore Collection was expanded and moved to Burdwan House, becoming the Folk Heritage Museum.

With funding from the Finance Division, under the Ministry of Cultural Affairs during the 2014–2017 fiscal period, the program "Burdwan House Folk Heritage Museum Expansion and Development" was implemented, and the Folk Heritage Museum was fully established.

As a themed museum, the Folk Heritage Museum showcases the creativity of Bangladesh's folk culture. The items displayed are representative samples of Bangladesh's folk culture and folklore, intended to introduce these to future generations. The museum contains about 500 items, including significant examples of folk art used in rural life: Gazi paintings, Shataranji, Rickshaw Paintings, Nakshi kantha, Jamdani, folk ornaments, and musical instruments. It also includes various items made of wood, clay, metal, shola, and other materials.

In 2020, the then Director General of Bangla Academy, Habibullah Siraji, opened the museum for public display. This specialized museum is available for visits by folk art researchers, folklore experts, and enthusiasts on an as-needed basis. On the eastern portion of the third floor are materials of folk literature collected from rural Bengal during the 1960s and 1970s.

== Gallery ==
Bardhaman House
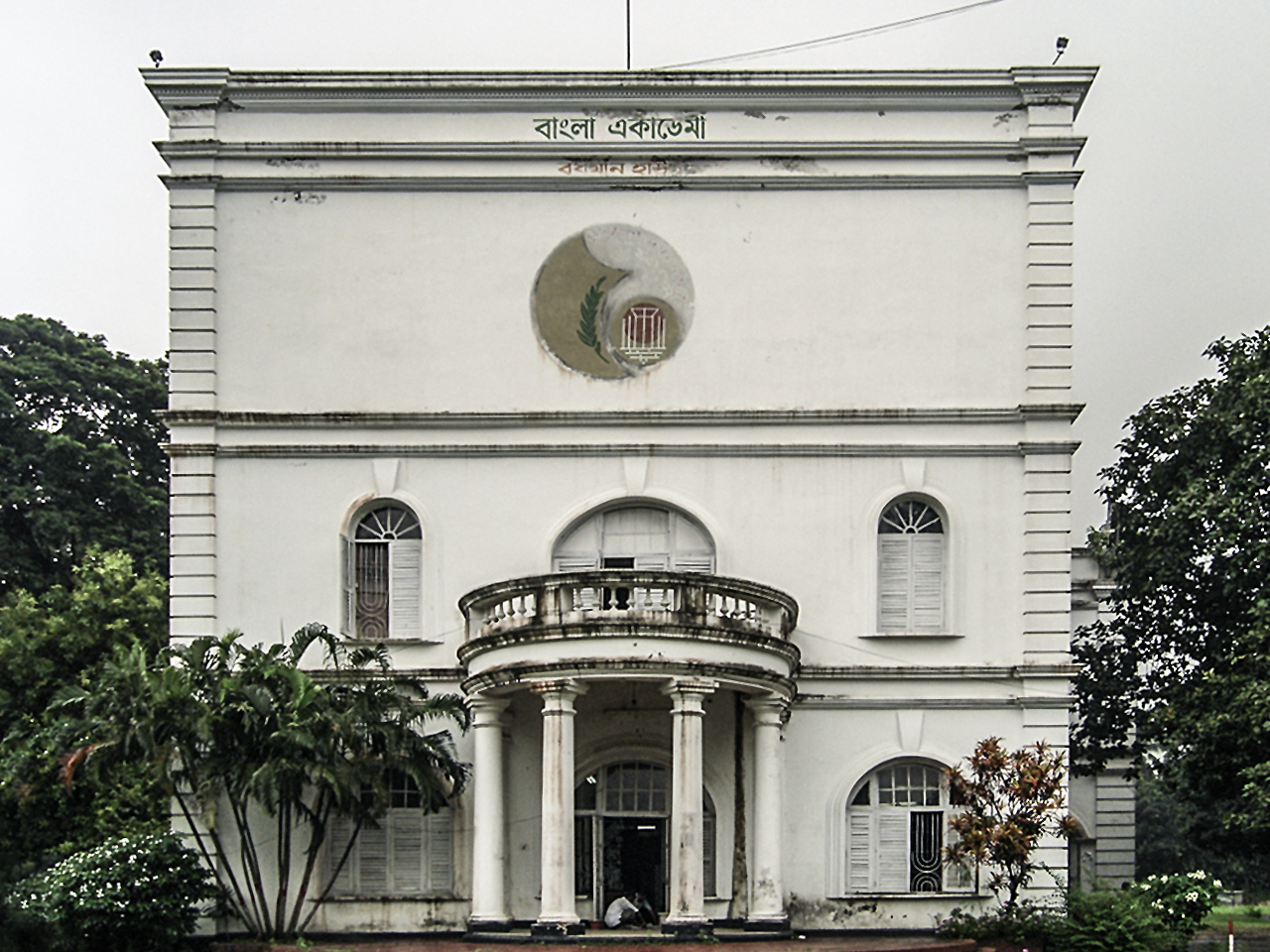
Front view of Burdwan House.

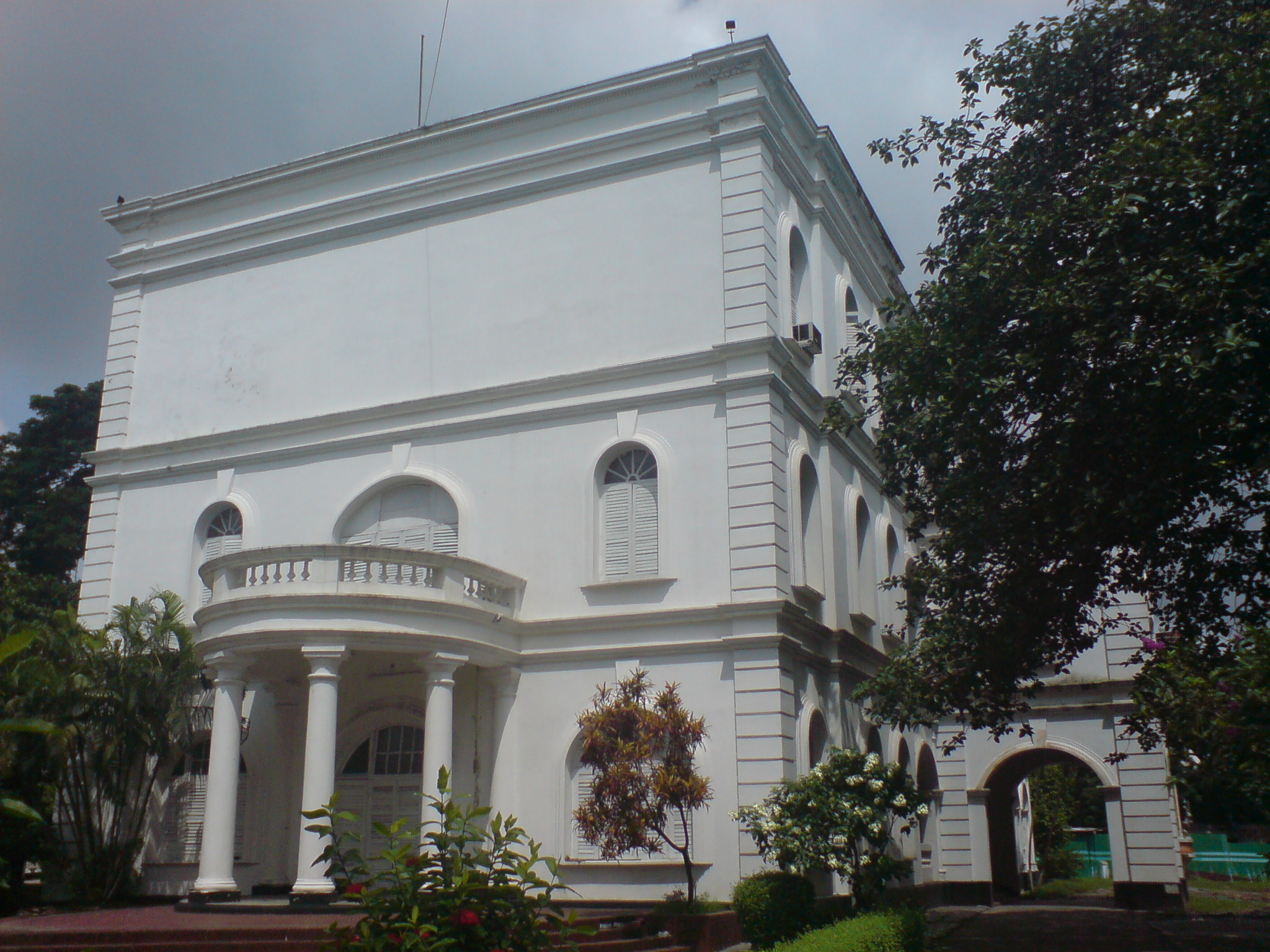
Broad semicircular carriage veranda with stairs in front of Burdwan House.

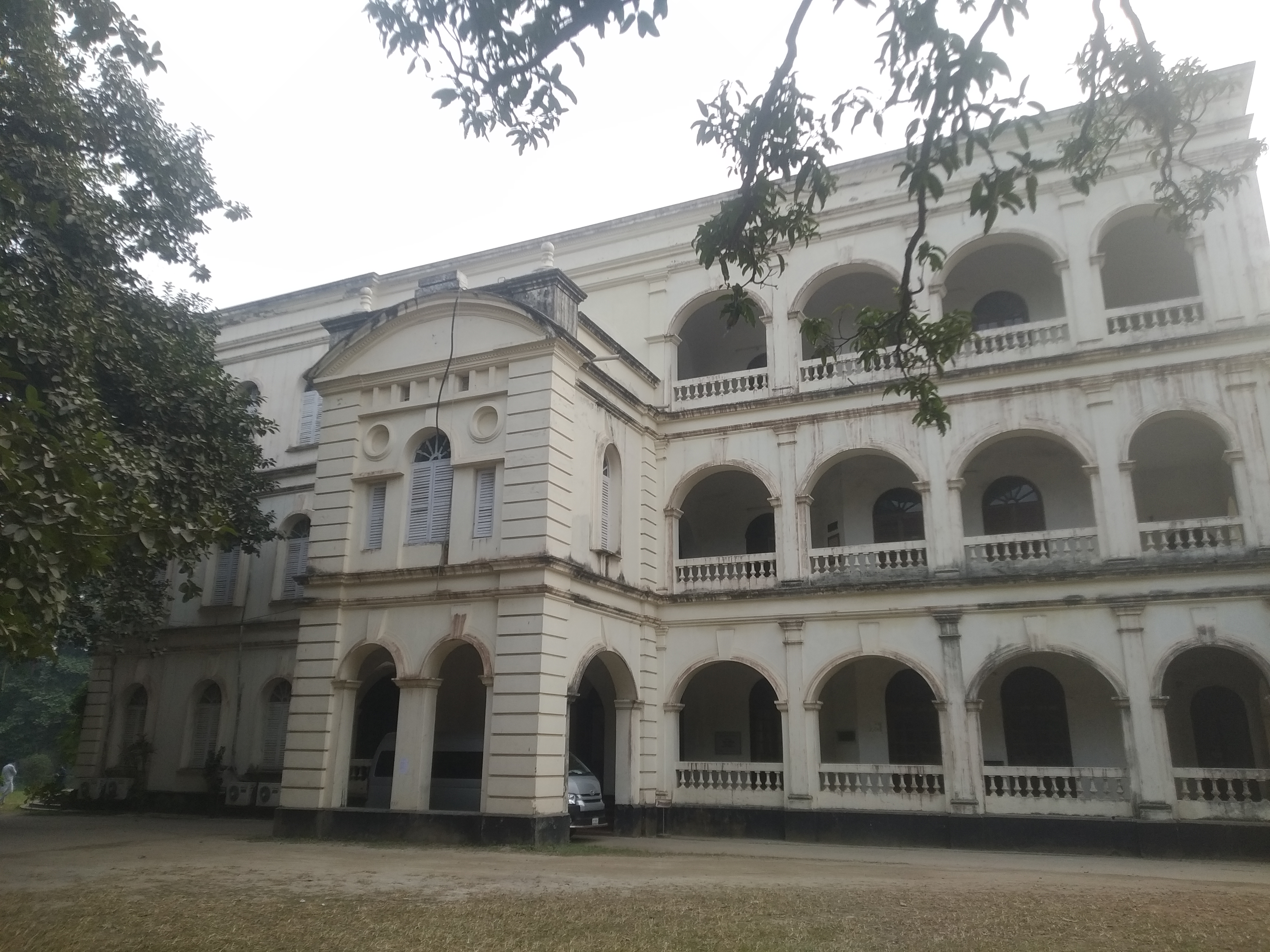
Side view of Burdwan House.

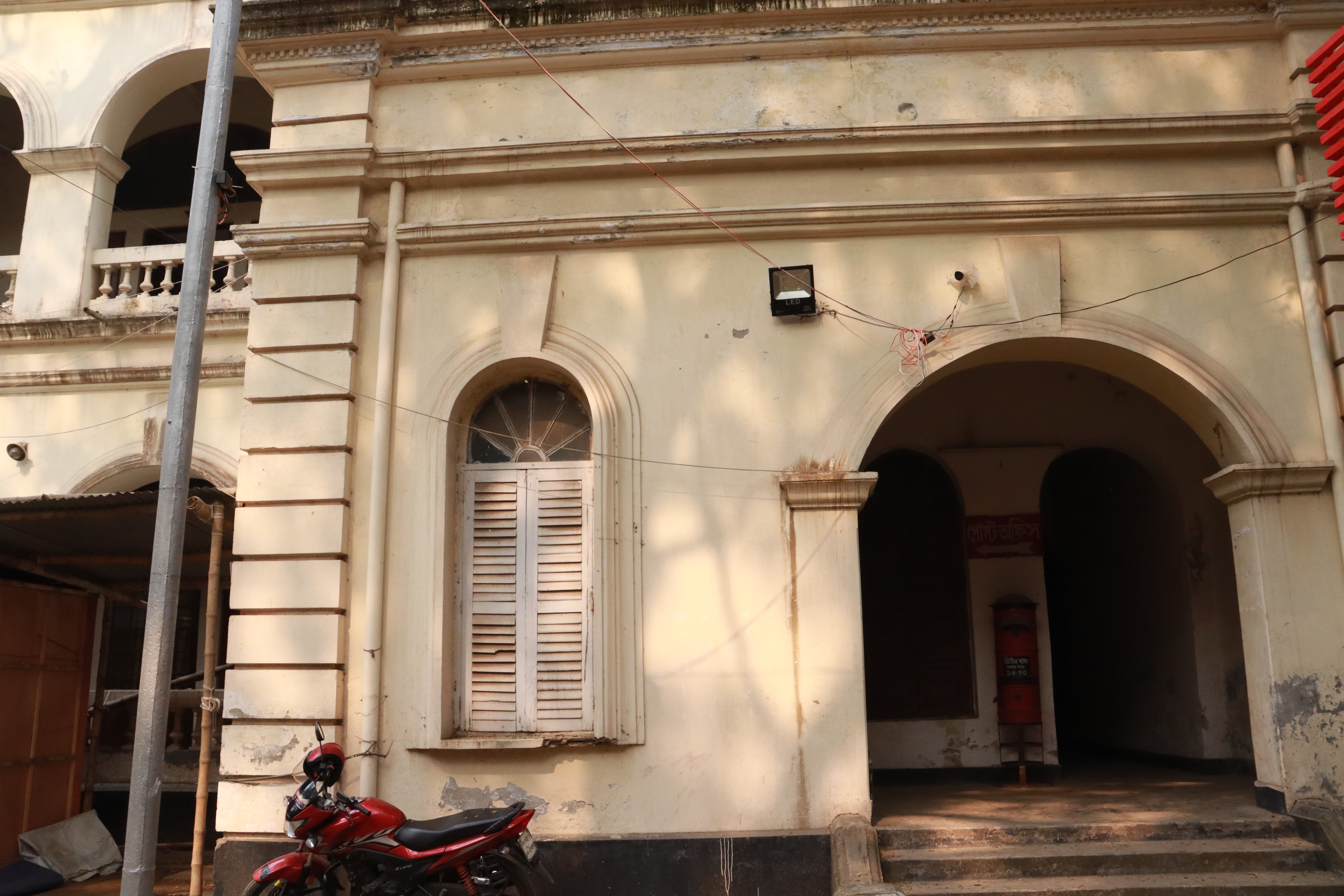
Back door of Burdwan House.

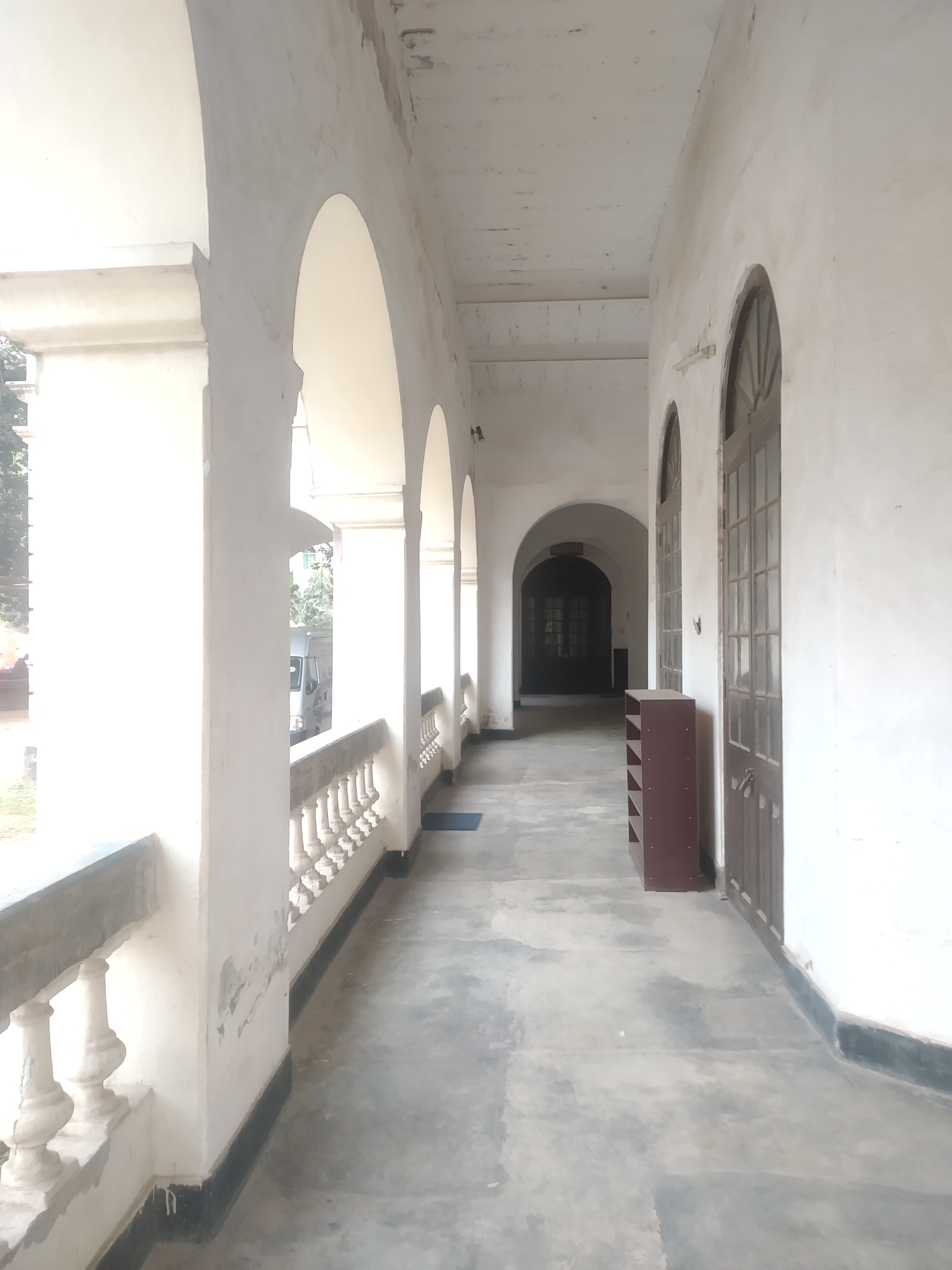
Hallway of Burdwan House.

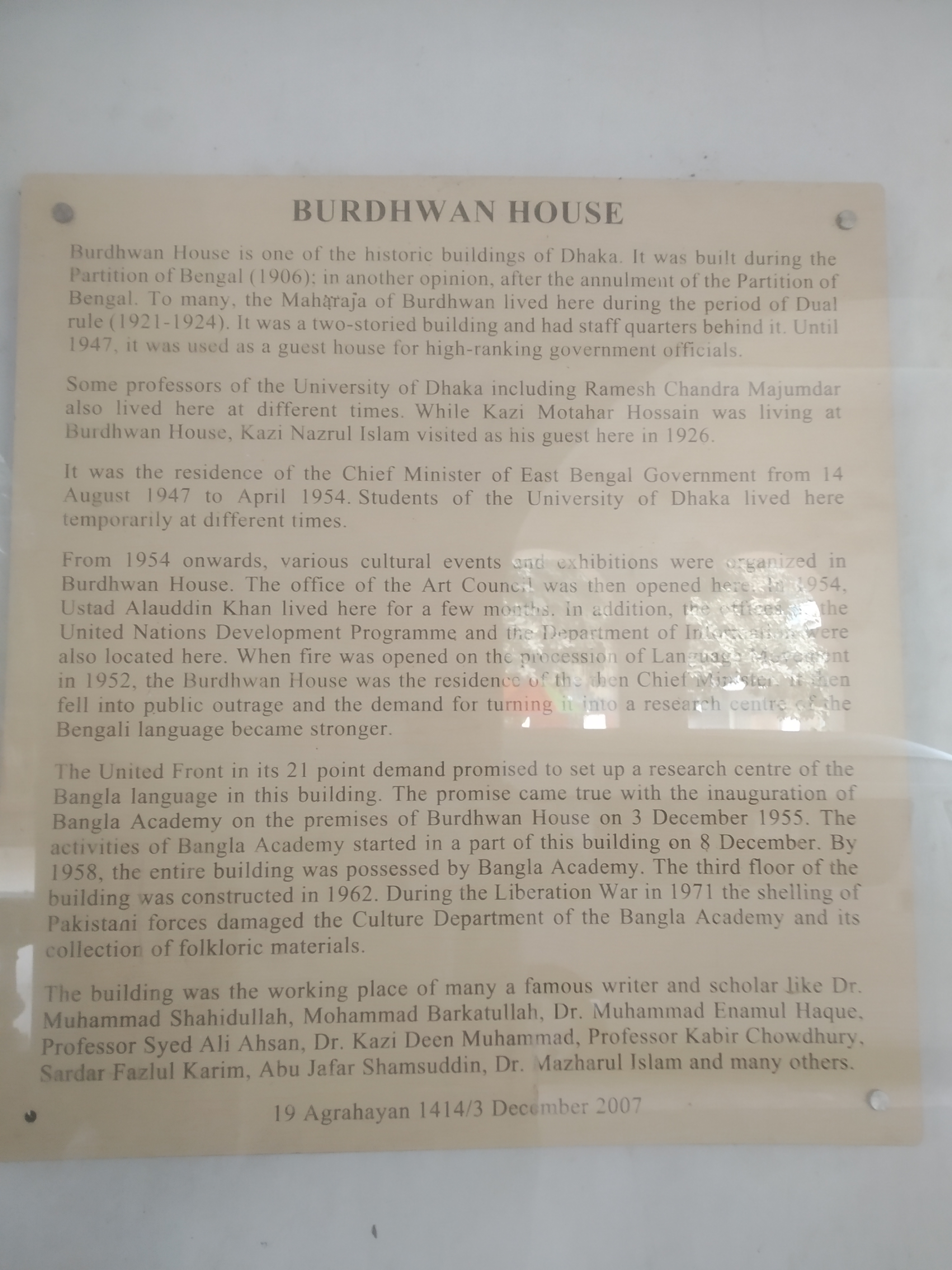
Plaque of Burdwan House.

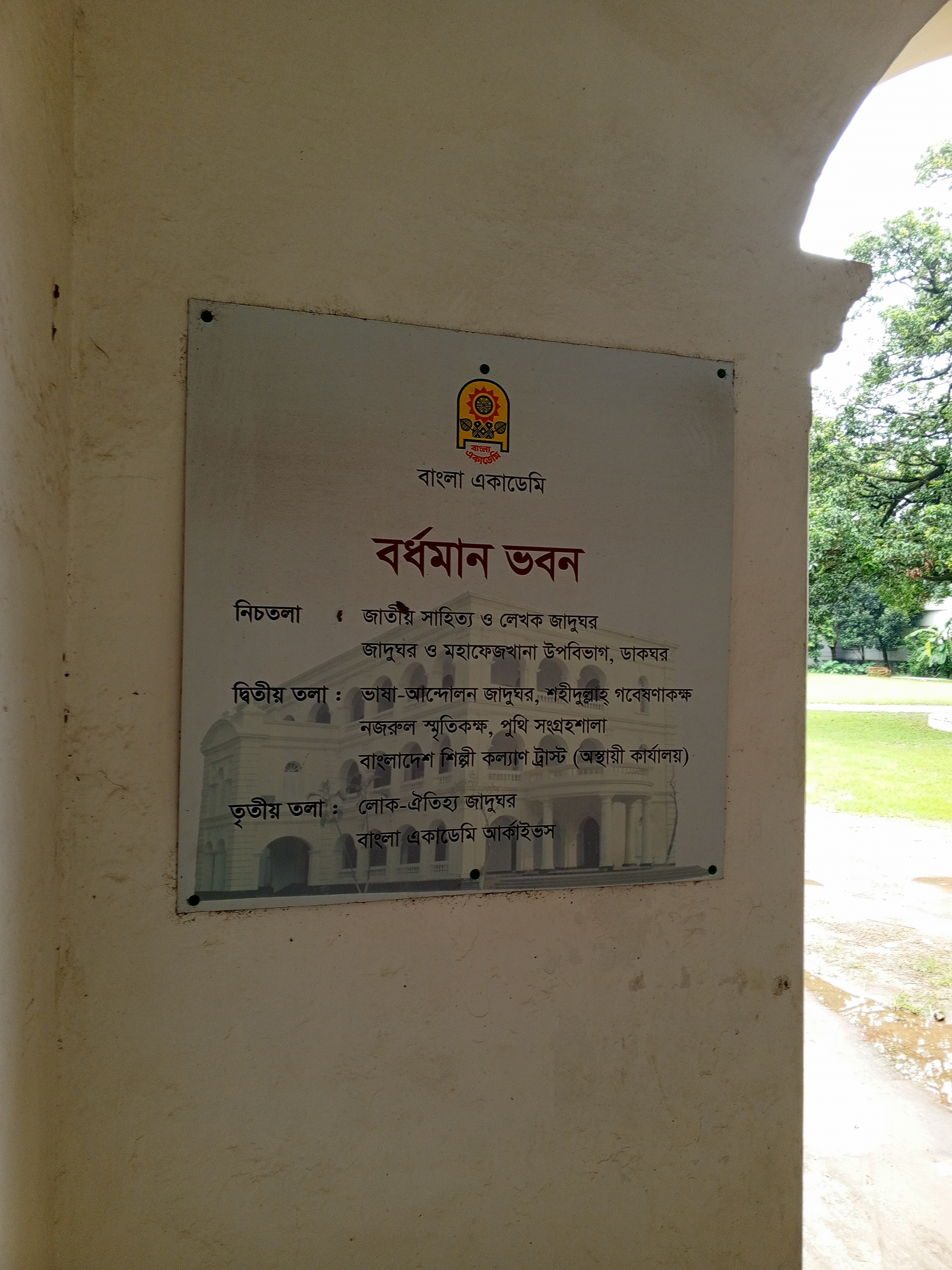
Floor indicator of Burdwan House.

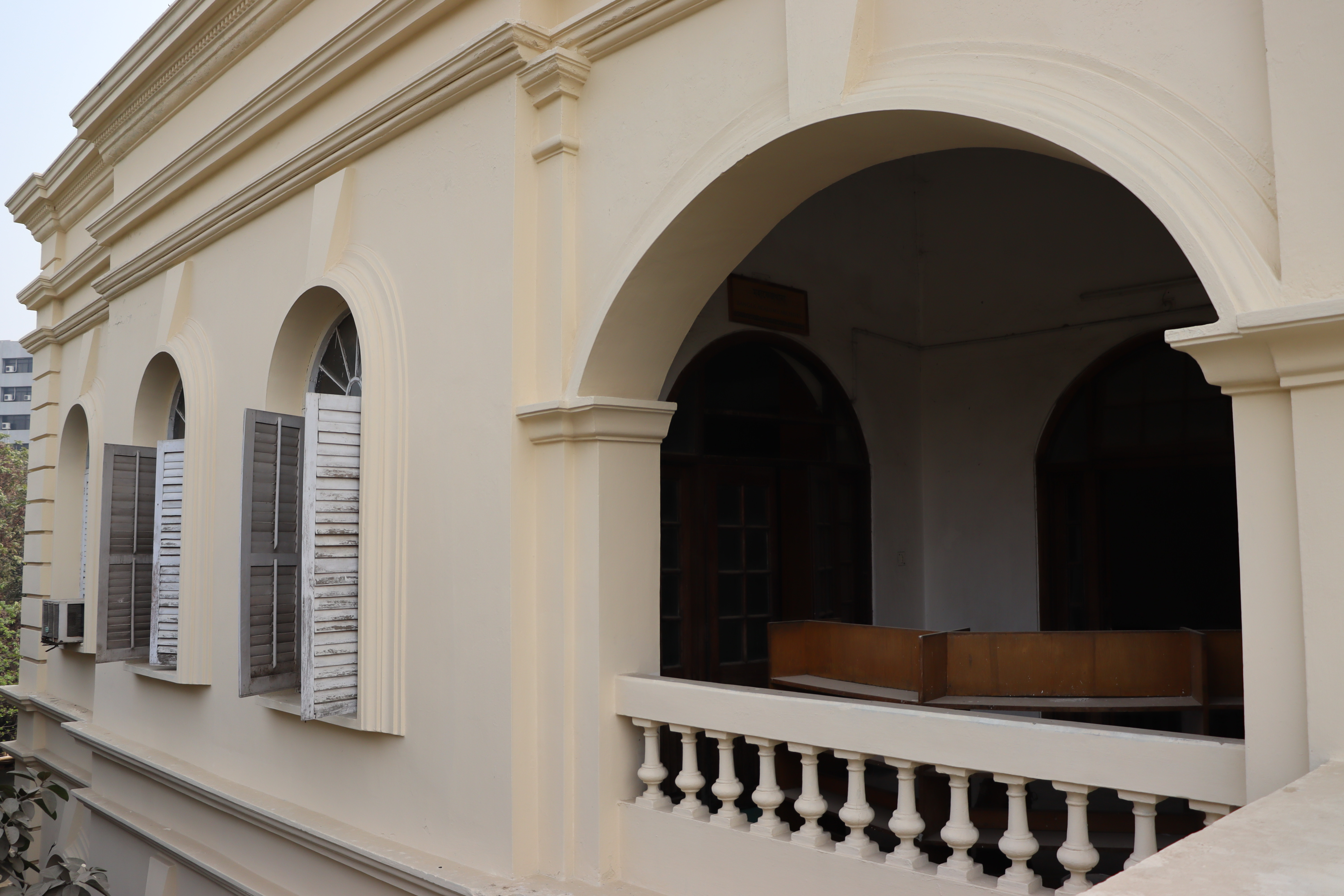
Windows of the third floor of Burdwan House.

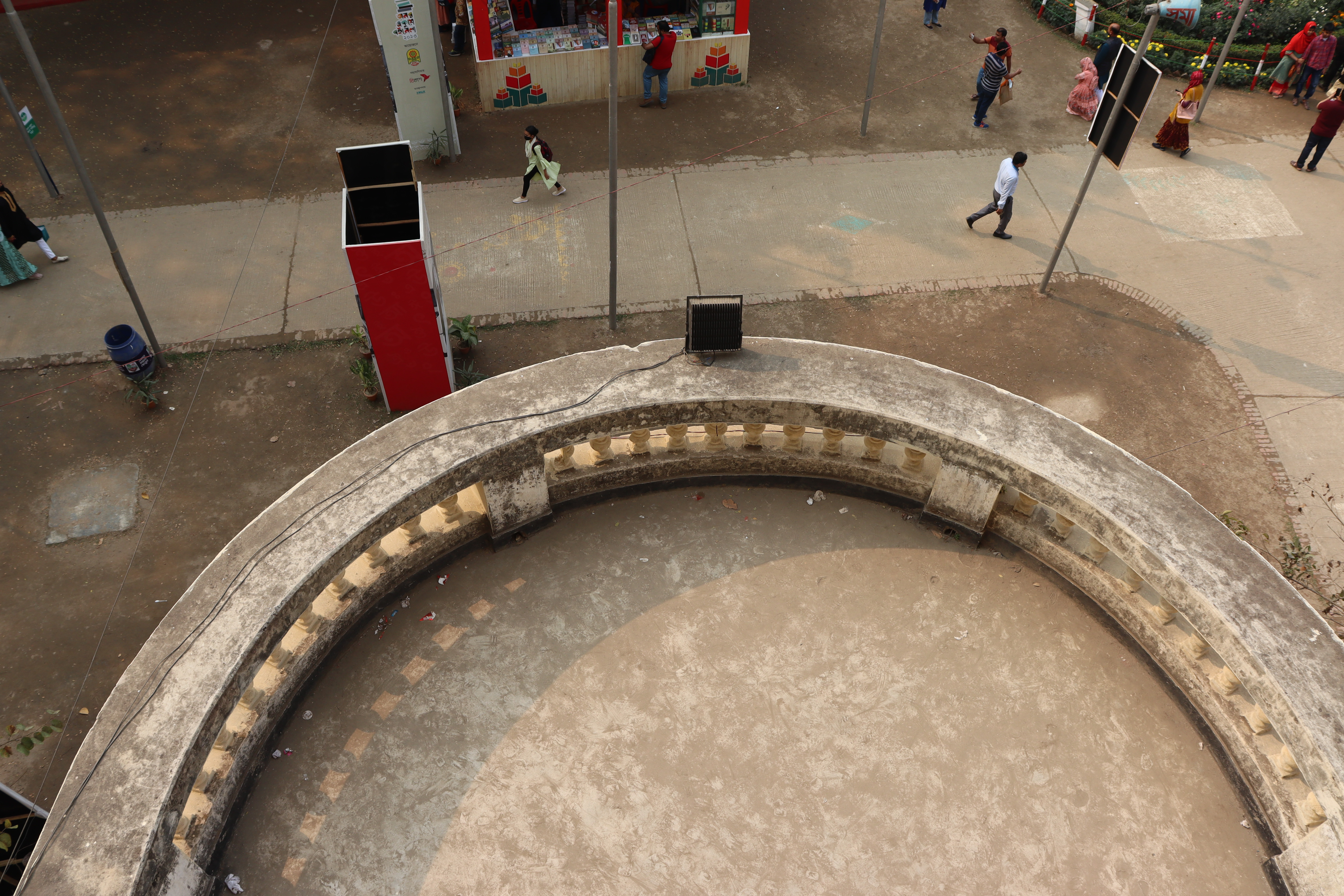
Ceiling of a veranda of Burdwan House.

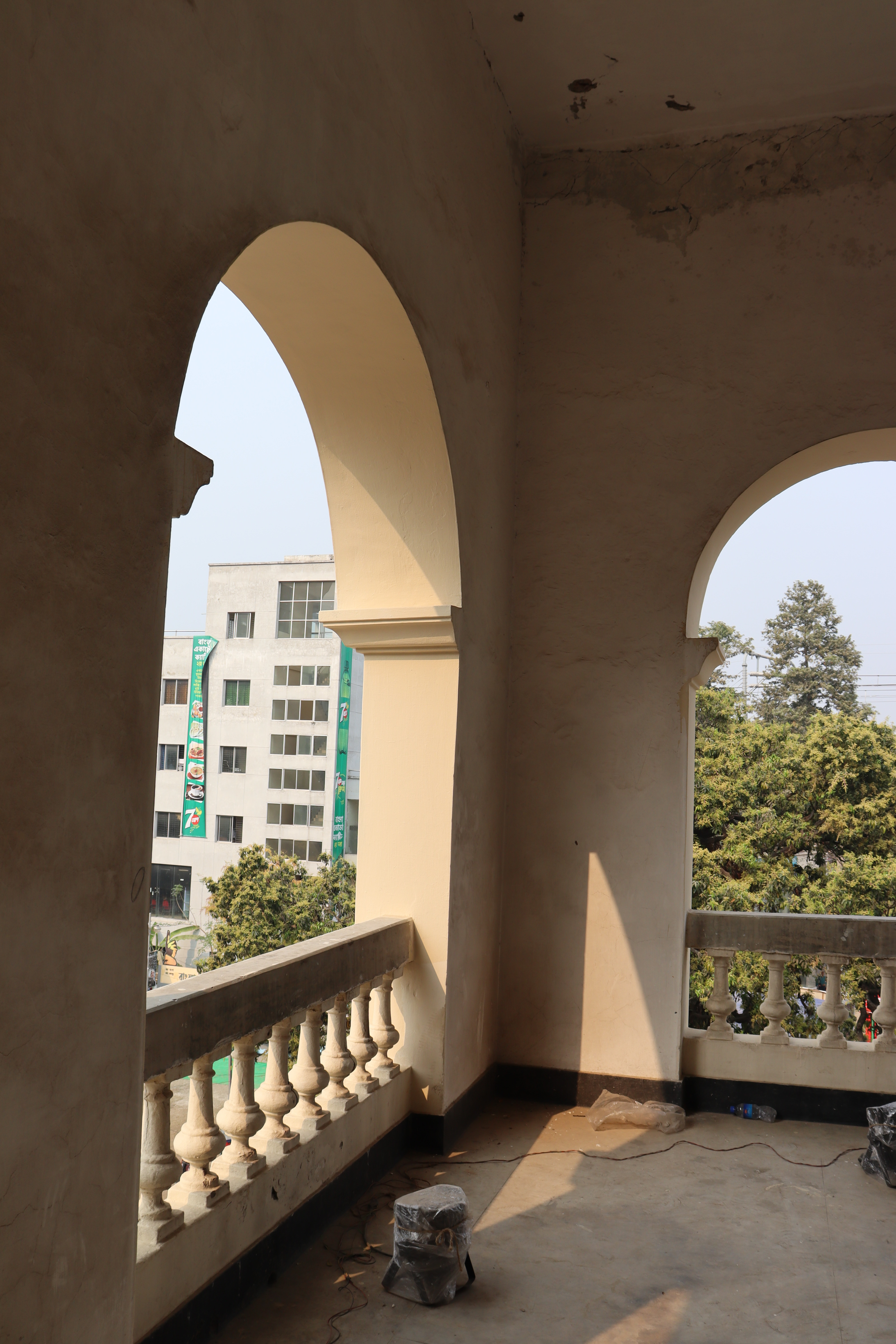
Baluster of the second floor of Burdwan House.

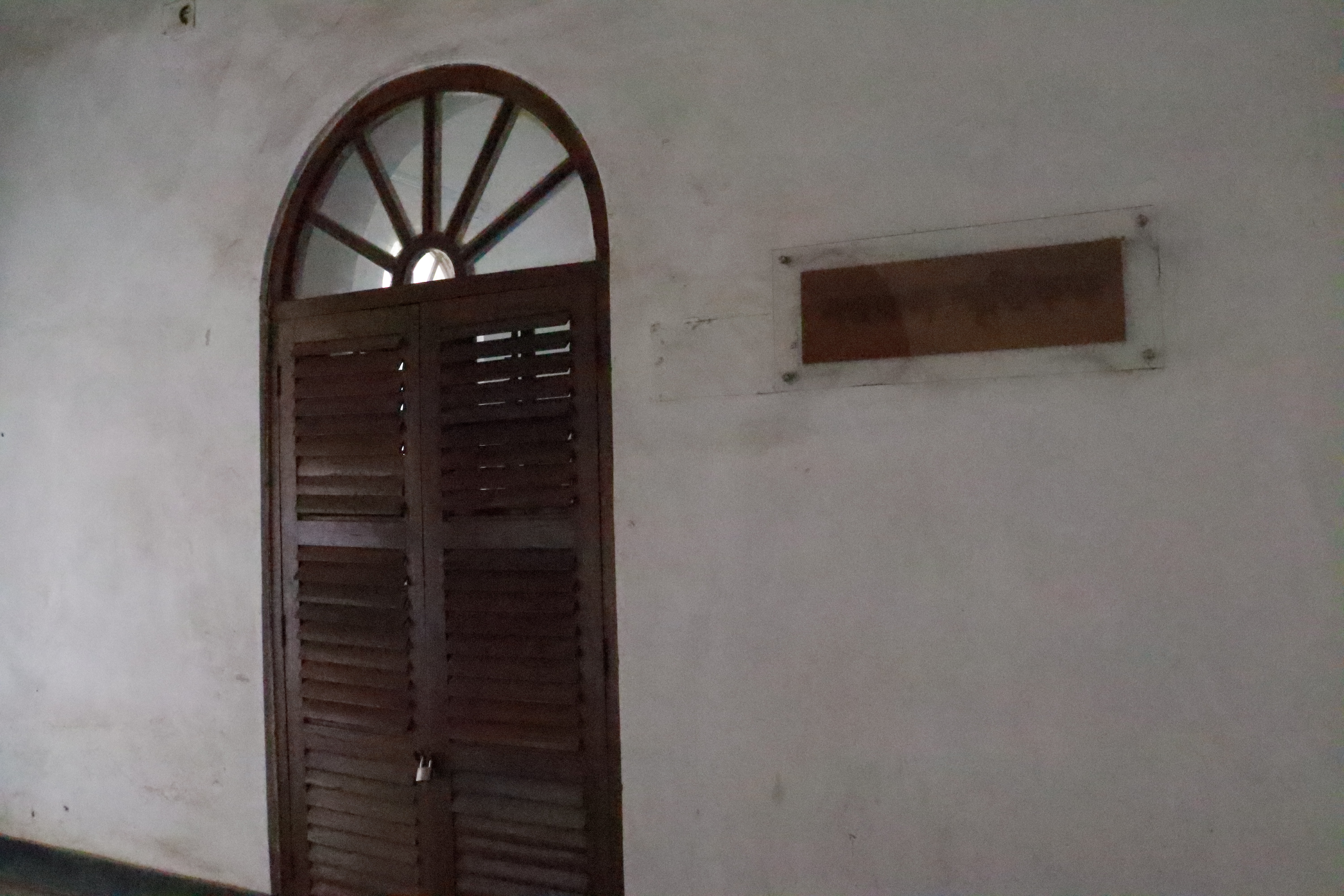
Nazrul Memorial Room.

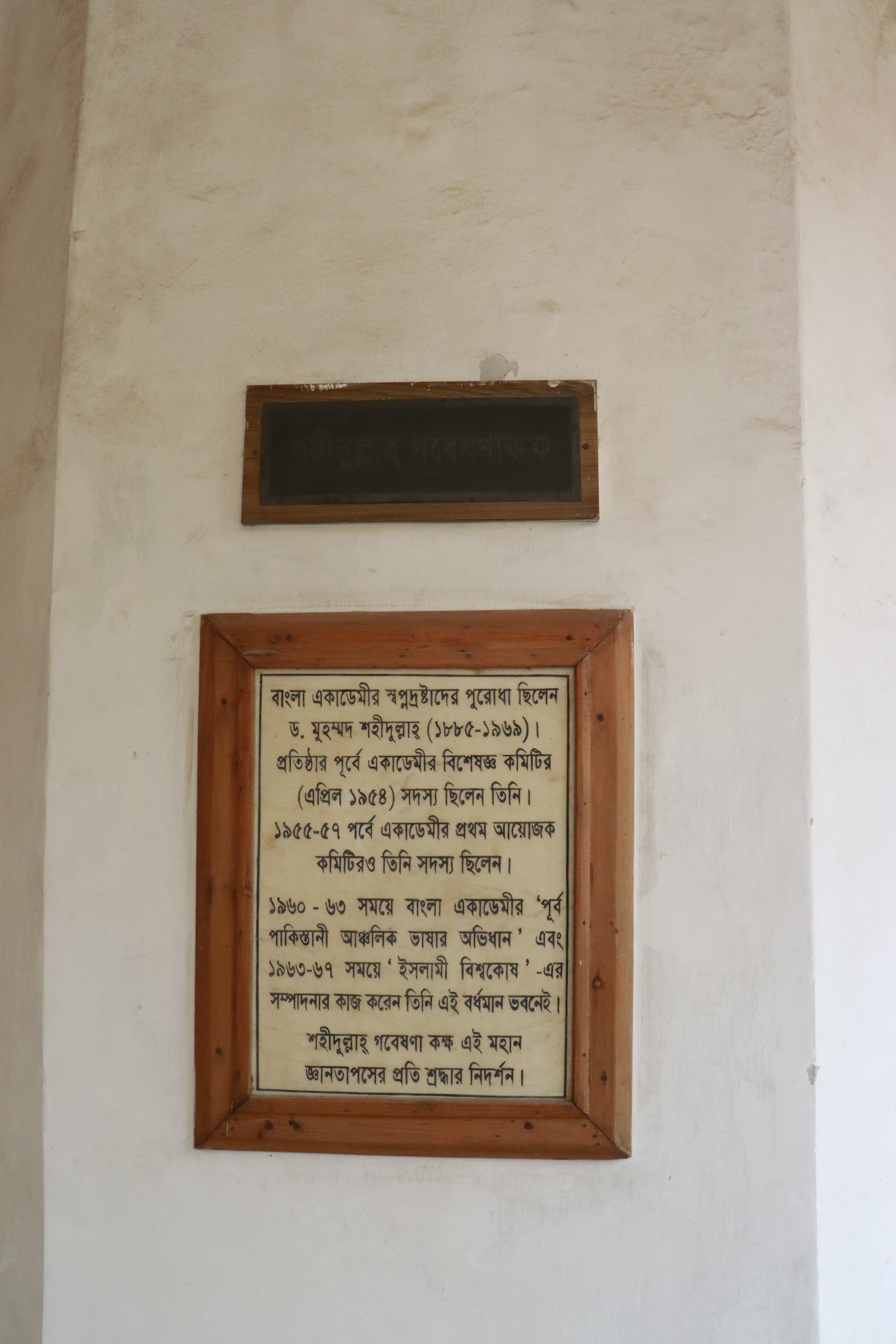
Shahidullah Research Room.

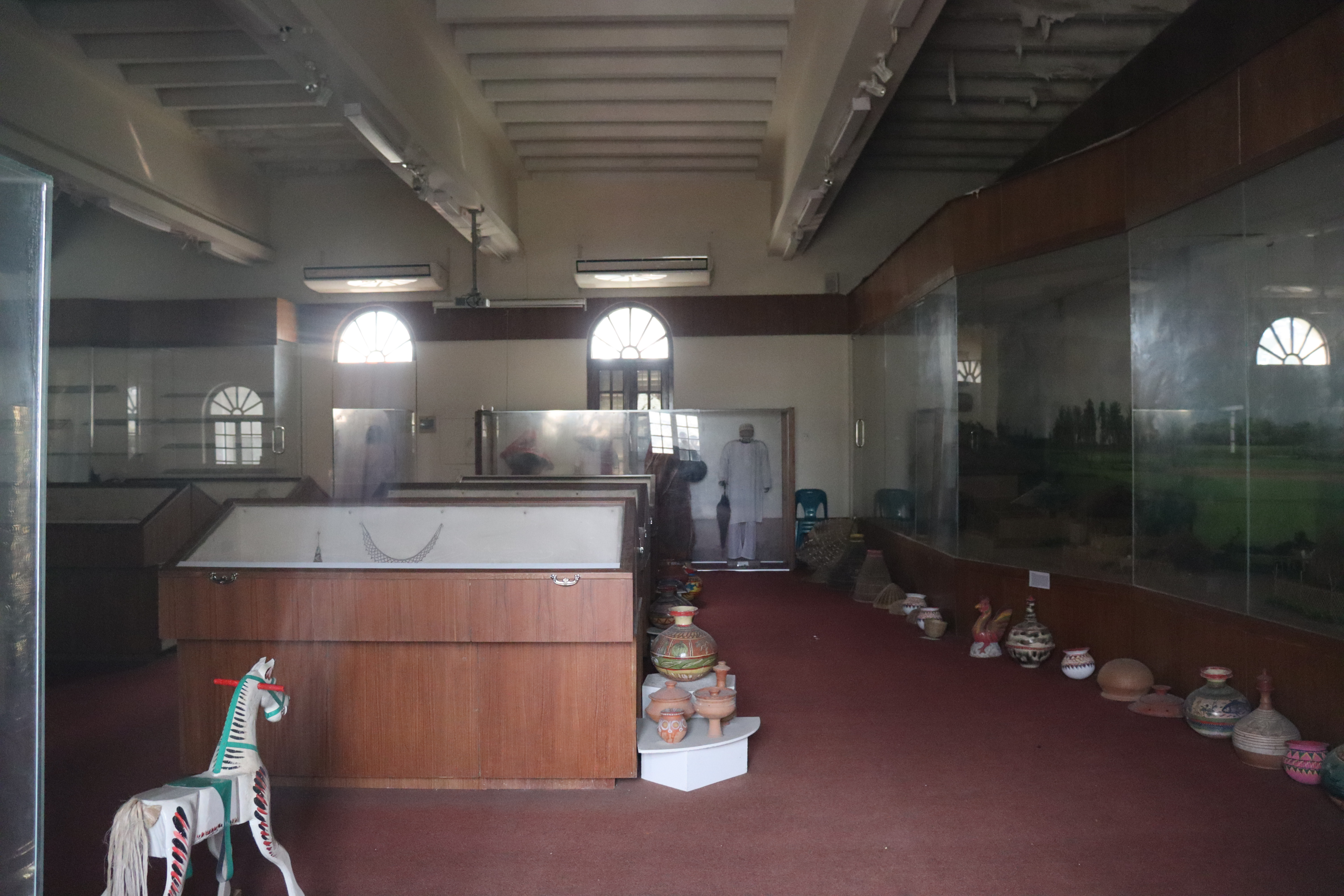
Folk Heritage Museum

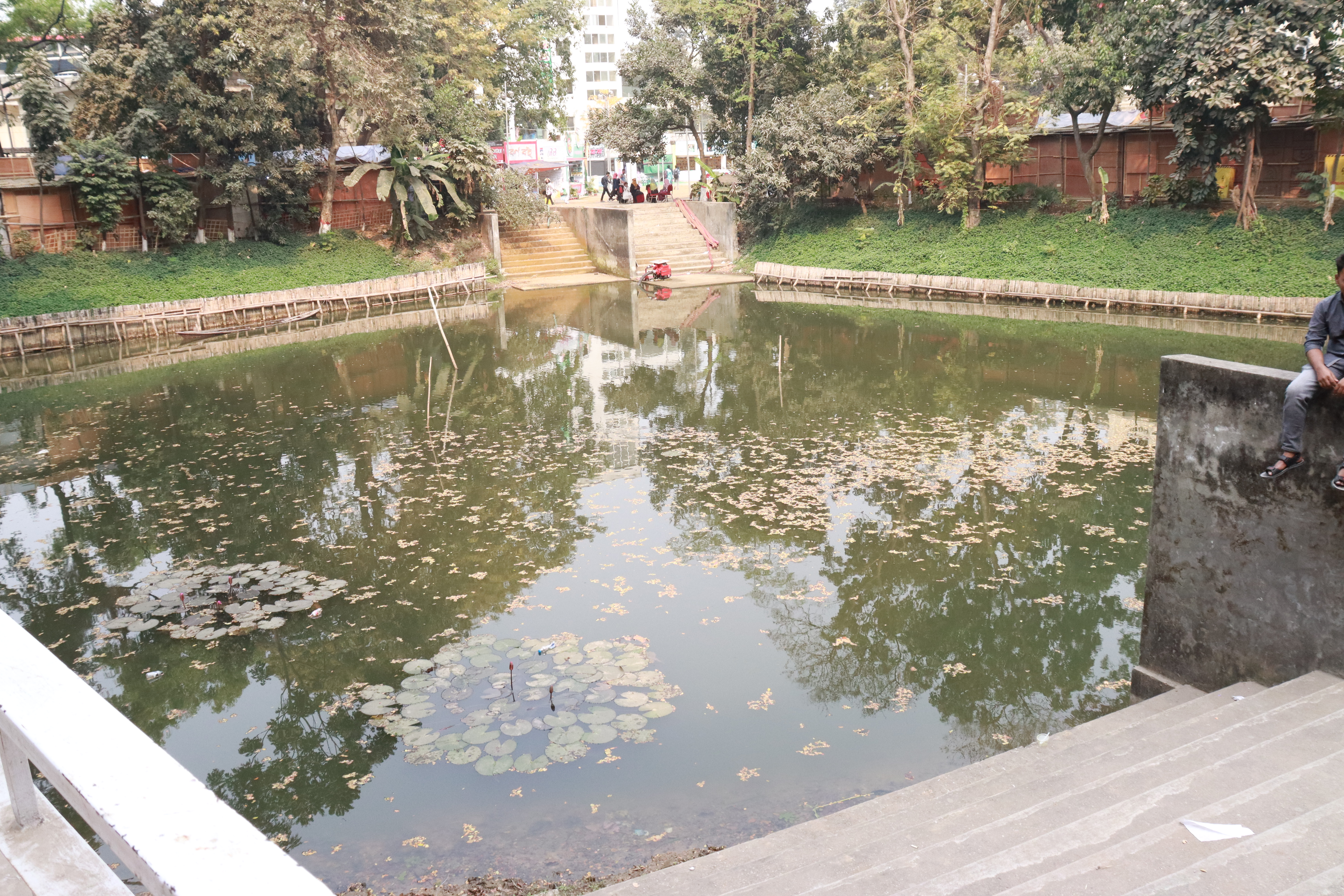
Pond of Bangla Academy.

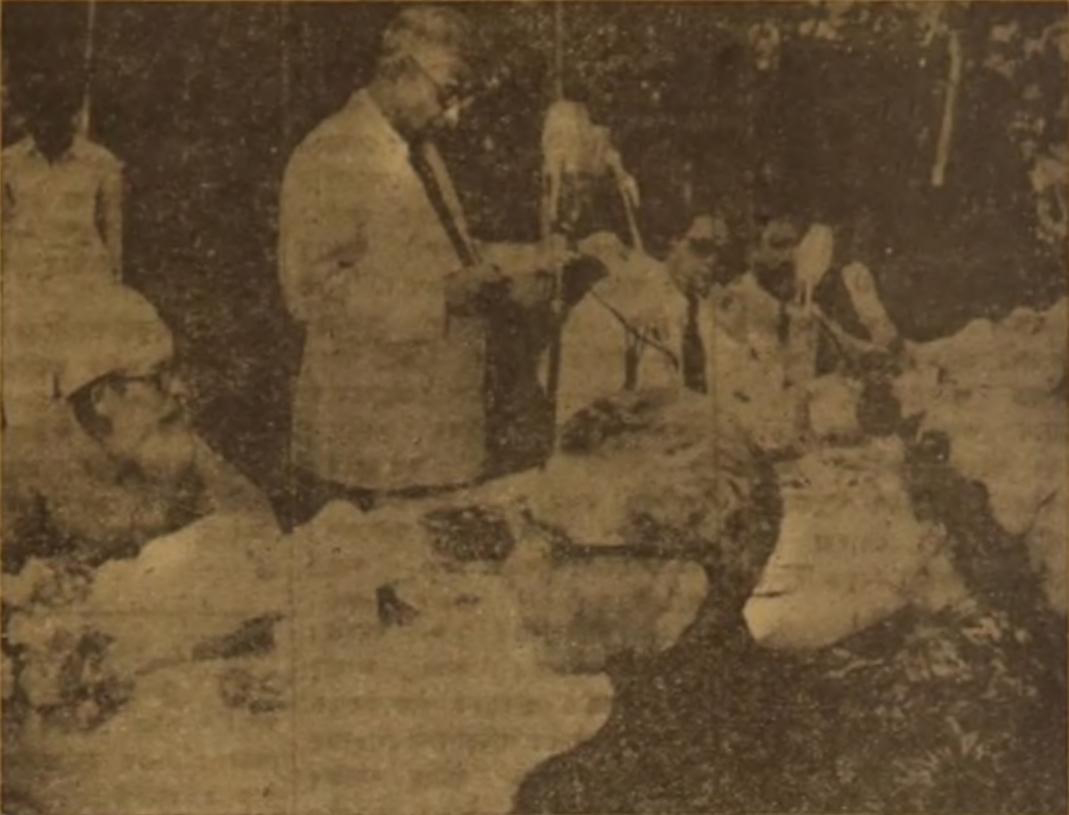
Abu Hussain Sarkar delivering a speech at the inauguration ceremony of Bangla Academy.

== See also ==
- Bangla Academy
- Ruplal House
- List of archaeological sites in Bangladesh
- Bengal Presidency
- R. C. Majumdar
- Qazi Motahar Hossain
