= George Harry Langley =

English academic

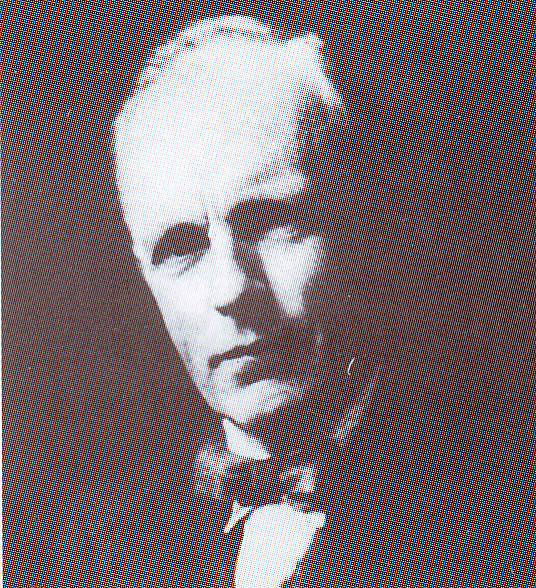
- Born: 14 July 1881; London, England
- Died: 14 February 1951 (aged 69)
- Education: MA (Philosophy)
- Alma mater: London University
- Occupations: professor of philosophy, university administrator

George Harry Langley (14 July 1881 – 14 February 1951) was an English academic who worked primarily in Dhaka, which was then in British India. He served as the second vice-chancellor of the University of Dhaka from 1926 to 1934.

== Education and career ==
Langley was born in London, England. He studied philosophy at University College, Reading (now the University of Reading) earning his bachelor's and master's as external degrees from the University of London in 1907 and 1909 respectively.

Langley started his career as a professor of philosophy at Presidency College, Kolkata in 1913 and moved to Dhaka College in 1914. In 1921, he joined the newly founded University of Dhaka as a professor of philosophy. He served as the vice-chancellor of the university from January 1926 until June 1934.

Langley was the chairman of Inter University Board of India during 1933–1934.
