= Jamalpur-1 =

Constituency of Bangladesh's Jatiya Sangsad

Coordinates: 25.16°N 89.76°E

- Constituency for the Jatiya Sangsad
- District: Jamalpur District
- Division: Mymensingh Division
- Electorate: 431,707 (2026)

Current constituency
- Created: 1978
- Party: Bangladesh Nationalist Party
- Member: M. Rashiduzzaman Millat
- ← 137 Tangail-8 139 Jamalpur-2 →

Jamalpur-1 is a constituency represented in the Jatiya Sangsad (National Parliament) of Bangladesh since 2026 by M. Rashiduzzaman Millat of the Bangladesh Nationalist Party.

== Boundaries ==
The constituency encompasses Baksiganj and Dewanganj upazilas.

== History ==
The constituency was created in 1978 from a Mymensingh constituency when the former Mymensingh District was split into two districts: Jamalpur and Mymensingh.

== Members of Parliament ==
Election	Member	Party
1979	Almas Hossain	Muslim League
1986	Abdus Sattar	Independent
1988	Abdus Sattar	Jatiya Party
1991	Abul Kalam Azad	Awami League
Feb 1996	AKM Moinul Haque	Bangladesh Nationalist Party
Jun 1996	Abul Kalam Azad	Awami League
2001	M. Rashiduzzaman Millat	Bangladesh Nationalist Party
2008	Abul Kalam Azad	Awami League
2024	Nur Mohammad	Awami League
2026	M. Rashiduzzaman Millat	Bangladesh Nationalist Party

== Elections ==
=== Elections in the 2020s ===
General Election 2026: Jamalpur-1 (Note: The vote counts for the top two candidates given by The Daily Ittefaq are somewhat higher than these given by The Business Standard, but the differences are not large enough to change the outcome.)
Party	Candidate	Votes	%	±%
BNP	M. Rashiduzzaman Millat	172,115	63.5	N/A
Jamaat	Nazmul Haque Saeedi	93,661	34.6	N/A
IAB	Md. Abdur Rouf Talukder	4,121	1.5	N/A
JP(E)	A. K. M. Fazlul Haque	931	0.3	N/A
GOP	Md. Rafiqul Islam	226	0.1	N/A
Majority		78,454	28.9	N/A
Turnout		271,054	62.8	N/A
BNP gain from AL				

=== Elections in the 2010s ===
General Election 2014: Jamalpur-1
Party	Candidate	Votes	%	±%
AL	Abul Kalam Azad	48,444	97.2	+48.4
Independent	Aziz Ahmed Hasan	1,372	2.8	N/A
Majority		47,072	94.5	+75.5
Turnout		49,816	16.5	−2.5
AL hold				

=== Elections in the 2000s ===
General Election 2008: Jamalpur-1
Party	Candidate	Votes	%	±%
AL	Abul Kalam Azad	115,722	48.8	+12.2
BNP	Sahida Akter Rita	70,680	29.8	−16.5
Independent	Nur Mohammed	49,654	20.9	N/A
KSJL	Md. Aminul Islam	1,235	0.5	N/A
Majority		45,042	19.0	+9.3
Turnout		237,291	80.7	+4.9
AL gain from BNP				

General Election 2001: Jamalpur-1
Party	Candidate	Votes	%	±%
BNP	M. Rashiduzzaman Millat	93,616	46.3	+36.1
AL	Abul Kalam Azad	73,959	36.6	+1.3
IJOF	M. A. Sattar	34,709	17.2	N/A
Majority		19,657	9.7	−3.4
Turnout		202,284	75.8	+7.2
BNP gain from AL				

=== Elections in the 1990s ===
General Election June 1996: Jamalpur-1
Party	Candidate	Votes	%	±%
AL	Abul Kalam Azad	46,722	35.3	−10.2
JP(E)	M. A. Sattar	29,341	22.1	+21.3
Independent	Md. Abdur Rashid	21,303	16.1	N/A
BNP	A. K. M. Mainul Haque	13,574	10.2	−19.8
Jamaat	Osman Gani	13,054	9.9	−11.7
Independent	Md. Mahabubul Haque Chish	8,157	6.2	N/A
Zaker Party	Solaiman	324	0.2	0.0
Majority		17,381	13.1	−2.4
Turnout		132,475	68.6	+30.4
AL hold				

General Election 1991: Jamalpur-1
Party	Candidate	Votes	%	±%
AL	Abul Kalam Azad	38,726	45.5	
BNP	I. A. M. Abdul Aziz	25,567	30.0	
Jamaat	Osman Gani	18,385	21.6	
JP(E)	Hasibur Rahman Miah	701	0.8	
BAKSAL	Jahangir Alam	649	0.8	
Independent	Azizul Haq	340	0.4	
Independent	A. N. M. Shafiqul Alam	266	0.3	
Independent	Z. M. Raihanul Haq	170	0.2	
Zaker Party	Solaiman Haq	168	0.2	
Bangladesh Muslim League (Kader)	Alamas Hoosain	125	0.1	
Majority		13,159	15.5	
Turnout		85,097	38.2	
AL gain from JP(E)				
