= A S M Abdul Halim =

Bangladeshi author, politician and administrator

A S M Abdul Halim is a former Cabinet Secretary of Bangladesh and published author. He is an advisory council member of Bangladesh Nationalist Party and former Prime Minister Khaleda Zia.

== Early life ==
Abdul Halim was born in Jamalpur District.

== Career ==
Abdul Halim was appointed secretary to the Ministry of Agriculture in December 2003. He was serving as the secretary to the Ministry of Textiles and Jute.

On 24 November 2005, Abdul Halim was appointed Cabinet Secretary replacing Dr Saadat Hussain. From November 2005 to August 2006, he was the chairman of Officers Club, Dhaka.

In December 2005, Abdul Halim spoke at a rally of the Bangladesh Nationalist Party in Jamalpur District. This was criticized by many including Sultan Mahmud Babu, member of parliament, as the civil administration is meant to be neutral and Abdul Halim was a serving civil service officer. He denied it was a political event and that he had violated the Government Servants (Conduct) Rules 1979.

Abdul Halim contract was extended after he reached the age of retirement. He joined the Bangladesh Nationalist Party in October 2006 one month after his retirement by presenting a flower bouquet to former Prime Minister Khaleda Zia.

Halim was the chairman of the Greater Mymensingh Cultural Forum in 2007.

In April 2015, Abdul Halim met the Election Commission as part of the delegation of the Bangladesh Nationalist Party.

Abdul Halim is an advisor to former Prime Minister Khaleda Zia. In 2018, he sought the Bangladesh Nationalist Party nomination for Jamalpur-2. The nomination went to Sultan Mahmud Babu who lost to Md Faridul Haque Khan of the Awami League.
