= Almas Hossain =

Bangladeshi politician and former MP

- আলমাস হোসেন

Member of the Bangladesh Parliament for Jamalpur-1
- In office 18 February 1979 – 12 February 1982
- Preceded by: Md. Delwar Hossain
- Succeeded by: Abdus Sattar

Personal details
- Born: 1933 or 1934 (age 91–92) Baksiganj, Jamalpur, Mymensingh District
- Party: Bangladesh Muslim League

Almas Hossain (Bengali: আলমাস হোসেন) is a Bangladeshi politician and former member of parliament.

== Early life ==
Hossain was born in 1933 or 1934 into a Bengali Muslim family in Baksiganj, Jamalpur, Mymensingh District.

== Career ==
Hossain contested the Mymensingh XXI constituency in the 1965 East Pakistan Provincial Assembly election. He was expelled from the Convention Muslim League for not standing down when the party nominated someone else for the seat. He stayed in the race as an independent, and finished second behind another independent, Abdus Samad.

Hossain joined the Qayyum Muslim League (QML). The QML selected him as their candidate for the Mymensingh-I constituency in the 1970 Pakistani general election. In a six-way contest, he came third, behind the Awami League and the Jamaat-e-Islami Pakistan candidate.

The Pakistan Peoples Party selected Hossain as their candidate for Mymensingh-1 in the 1971 East Pakistan by-elections, but before they could be held Bangladesh won its independence.

During the 1979 Bangladeshi general elections, Hossain was elected as a member of parliament for the newly renamed Jamalpur-1 constituency as a Bangladesh Muslim League candidate. He was defeated in the fifth parliamentary elections of 1991 by Jatiya Party politician Abdus Sattar.
