= M. Rashiduzzaman Millat =

Bangladeshi politician

- এম. রশিদুজ্জামান মিল্লাত
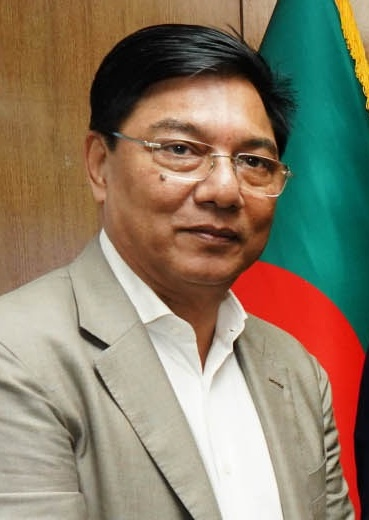
- Millat in 2026

Minister of Civil Aviation and Tourism
- Incumbent
- Assumed office 21 August 2026
- Prime Minister: Tarique Rahman
- Preceded by: Afroza Khanam Rita

Member of the Bangladesh Parliament for Jamalpur-1
- Incumbent
- Assumed office 17 February 2026
- Preceded by: Nur Mohammad
- In office 28 October 2001 – 27 October 2006
- Preceded by: Abul Kalam Azad
- Succeeded by: Abul Kalam Azad

Minister of State for Civil Aviation and Tourism
- In office 17 February 2026 – 21 August 2026
- Prime Minister: Tarique Rahman
- Preceded by: Md. Mahbub Ali

Personal details
- Born: 14 January 1961 (age 65)
- Party: Bangladesh Nationalist Party
- Spouse: Mabia Suraiya
- Children: 1 son

M. Rashiduzzaman Millat (born 14 January 1961) is a Bangladesh Nationalist Party politician and the incumbent Jatiya Sangsad member representing the Jamalpur-1 constituency (Dewanganj–Baksiganj). He is the incumbent minister of civil aviation and tourism since August 2026.

== Education ==
M. Rashiduzzaman Millat earned a Master of Arts degree in Islamic studies from Uttara University, Bangladesh, in 2014.

== Career ==
Millat was first elected to Jatiya Sangsad representing Jamalpur-1 as a Bangladesh Nationalist Party candidate in October 2001.

In October 2007, the Anti-Corruption Commission (ACC) submitted charges against Millat, his wife Mabia Suraiya and son Sayed Bin Jaman Sourav in connection with a case filed for concealing Tk 4,82,05,695 from their wealth information. In November, a special court sentenced Millat to six years imprisonment for not paying Tk 4.51 crore tax during the tax years 1988–89 to 2005–06. Bangladesh Supreme Court barred him from contesting the 2018 Bangladeshi general election due to his conviction.

Millat won the 2026 Bangladeshi general election contesting at the Jamalpur-1 constituency securing 173,656 votes while his nearest opponent Bangladesh Jamaat-e-Islami candidate Nazmul Haque Saeedi got 97,820 votes.
