= AKM Moinul Haque =

Bangladeshi politician

- এ কে এম ময়নুল হক

Member of Parliament for Jamalpur-1
- In office 15 February 1996 – 12 June 1996
- Preceded by: Abul Kalam Azad
- Succeeded by: Abul Kalam Azad

Personal details
- Born: Jamalpur
- Party: Bangladesh Nationalist Party

AKM Moinul Haque is a politician from Jamalpur District of Bangladesh. He was elected a member of parliament for Jamalpur-1 in February 1996.

== Career ==
AKM Moinul Haque was elected to parliament for the Jamalpur-1 constituency as a Bangladesh Nationalist Party candidate in the February 1996 Bangladeshi general election. He stood for reelection unsuccessfully in the 7th parliamentary elections on 12 June 1996.
