= Masjid-e-Noor =

Masjid-e-Noor may refer to:

- Masjid-e-Noor (Rupsha Zamindar Bari), established in 1877-78 AD Faridganj Upazila.
- Masjid-e-Noor (Baksiganj), established in 2018 AD at Baksiganj Upazila.
