= Ashraf Ud-Dowlah Pahlowan =

Bangladeshi politician

Ashraf Ud-Doullah Pahloan
- আশরফ উদ দৌলা পালোয়ান

Member of Jatiya Sangsad
- In office 3 March 1988 – 27 February 1991
- Preceded by: Rashed Mosharraf
- Succeeded by: Rashed Mosharraf
- Constituency: Jamalpur-2

Personal details
- Born: Jamalpur, Mymensingh district
- Died: 22 December 2002 Bangladesh
- Party: Jatiya Party (Ershad)
- Parent: Abdul Jabbar Palwan (father)

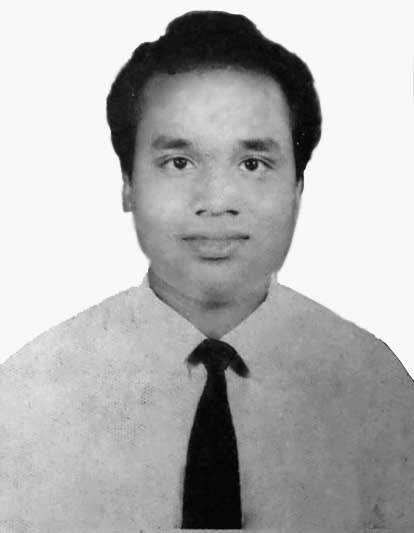
Asraf ud Dowlah Pahlowan

Ashraf Ud-Doullah Pahloan (Bengali: আশরফুদ্দৌলা পালোয়ান; died 22 December 2002) was a politician and a former member of parliament for Jamalpur-2.

== Early life and education ==
Pahloan was born in Jamalpur, Mymensingh district. He belonged to the Bengali Pahlowan family of Chinaduli in Islampur, Jamalpur. Pahloan was the fourth son of Abdul Jabbar Palwan, a former member of the Bengal Legislative Council. He graduated from the University of Dacca.

== Career ==
Pahloan was a former general secretary of the Dhaka University Central Students' Union. He was elected to the Jatiya Sangsad following the 1988 Bangladeshi general election as a Jatiya Party (Ershad) candidate for the Jamalpur-2 constituency. He failed to maintain his seat at the 1991 Bangladeshi general election.

== Death ==
Pahloan died in Bangladesh on 22 December 2002.
