= Abul Kalam Azad (Jamalpur-1 MP) =

Bangladeshi politician

- আবুল কালাম আজাদ
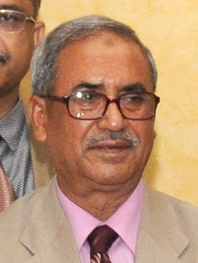

Member of Parliament for Jamalpur-1
- In office 25 January 2009 – 29 January 2024
- Preceded by: M. Rashiduzzaman Millat
- Succeeded by: Nur Mohammad

Ministry of Cultural Affairs
- In office 16 September 2012 – 24 January 2014
- Succeeded by: Asaduzzaman Noor

Minister of Information
- In office 6 January 2009 – 13 September 2012
- Preceded by: Chowdhury Sajjadul Karim
- Succeeded by: Hasanul Haq Inu

Personal details
- Born: 1 March 1939 (age 87)
- Party: Bangladesh Awami League
- Relatives: Sheikh Fazlul Karim Selim

Abul Kalam Azad (born 1 March 1939) is a former Jatiya Sangsad member representing the Jamalpur-1 constituency. He is also a former information and cultural affairs minister of Bangladesh.

== Early life and education ==
Azad was born on 1 March 1939 to a Bengali Muslim family in the village of Khewarchar Ujan in Bakhshiganj, Jamalpur, then part of the Mymensingh district of the Bengal Presidency. He was the second among the eight sons and four daughters of Saiyadur Rahman and Alhaj Samirunnesa. Azad passed his matriculation from Rajendra Kishore High School in Gauripur, and passed his Higher Secondary Certificate from Ananda Mohan College, Mymensingh in 1958. He graduated with a Bachelor of Arts degree in political science from the University of Dacca in 1961. Azad received his Master of Arts in the same subject from the same university in 1963. In 1972, Azad graduated from the Dhaka Central Law College with a Bachelor of Laws degree.

He is a relative of Fazlul Karim Selim of the Sheikh family of Tungipara, whilst his in-laws are a zamindar family of Muslim Chowdhuries from Daudkandi.

== Career ==
From 2009 to 2012, Azad served as the information minister.

=== Controversies ===
Censorship

In 2009, when Azad was inaugurated as the minister of information, he promised journalists that the government would ensure right to information and freethinking in Bangladesh and sought "constructive criticism" from editors in the print and electronic media. However, in 2010, he changed his stance and ordered that the government would enact a law to curb what he term "yellow journalism". Analysts say such laws were only enacted to curb the freedom of the press and dissident voices. The press secretary to the prime minister of Bangladesh, Abul Kalam Azad, said "pornography has spread like a disease in Bangladesh".

Intra-party feud

In 2015, Azad was sent a show cause order by his own party, the Bangladesh Awami League, for working against party policy and supporting a rebel candidate.
