= Rashed Mosharraf =

Bangladeshi politician

- রাশেদ মোশাররফ

Member of Parliament for Jamalpur-2
- In office June 1996 – October 2001
- Succeeded by: Sultan Mahmud Babu
- In office March 1991 – November 1995
- Preceded by: Ashraf Ud-Doullah Pahloan
- In office 1986–1988
- Preceded by: Karimuzzaman Talukder

State Minister of Land
- In office June 1996 – October 2001
- Succeeded by: Shahjahan Omar

Personal details
- Born: 12 May 1941 Jamalpur, Bengal, British India
- Died: 10 November 2011 (aged 70) Dhaka, Bangladesh
- Party: Bangladesh Awami League
- Relatives: Khaled Mosharraf (brother); Sayed Farooq Rahman (Nephew)

Rashed Mosharraf (died 10 November 2011) was a Bangladesh Awami League politician and a Jatiya Sangsad member representing the Jamalpur-2 constituency. He served as the state minister of land during 1996–2001. He was also the president of the Bangladesh Krishak League.

== Birth and Family Background ==
Rashed Mosharraf was born on 12 May 1941 to a Bengali Muslim family in a village now known as Mosharrafganj in Islampur of Jamalpur subdivision at Mymensingh district, Bengal Province. He was a son of Mosharraf Hossain and Jamila Akhter. His father Mosharraf Hossain was a successful businessman in the Jute trade and his home village Mosharrafganj was named after him. His family is described as being a landed clan and active in the politics of Bengal at the time.

== Career ==
Mosharraf served as the president of the Bangladesh Krishak League and six terms in parliament. He served as the State Minister of Land in the First Sheikh Hasina Cabinet. He served as the chairman of Janapath Housing Limited.

== Personal life ==
Mosharraf's elder brother, Khaled Mosharraf, served as a sector commander of the Mukti Bahini in the Bangladesh Liberation war. He and his mother organized a rally in support of the 3 November 1975 Bangladesh coup d'état launched by Khaled.

== Death ==
Mosharraf died on 10 November 2011, aged 70.
