= Jamalpur-2 =

Constituency of Bangladesh's Jatiya Sangsad

Coordinates: 25.08°N 89.79°E

- Constituency for the Jatiya Sangsad
- District: Jamalpur District
- Division: Mymensingh Division
- Electorate: 282,103 (2026)

Current constituency
- Created: 1978
- Party: Bangladesh Nationalist Party
- Member: Sultan Mahmud Babu
- ← 138 Jamalpur-1 140 Jamalpur-3 →

Jamalpur-2 is a constituency represented in the Jatiya Sangsad (National Parliament) of Bangladesh since 2026 by Sultan Mahmud Babu of the Bangladesh Nationalist Party.

== Boundaries ==
The constituency encompasses Islampur Upazila.

== History ==
The constituency was created in 1978 from the Mymensingh-2 constituency when the former Mymensingh District was split into two districts: Jamalpur and Mymensingh.

Ahead of the 2008 general election, the Election Commission redrew constituency boundaries to reflect population changes revealed by the 2001 Bangladesh census. The 2008 redistricting altered the boundaries of the constituency.

Ahead of the 2014 general election, the Election Commission reduced the boundaries of the constituency. Previously it had included two union parishads of Melandaha Upazila: Mahmudpur and Shaympur.

== Members of Parliament ==
Election	Member	Party
1979	Rashed Mosharraf	Awami League
Major Boundary Changes
1986	Rashed Mosharraf	Awami League
1988	Ashraf Ud-Doullah Pahloan	Jatiya Party
1991	Rashed Mosharraf	Awami League
Feb 1996	Sultan Mahmud Babu	Bangladesh Nationalist Party
Jun 1996	Rashed Mosharraf	Awami League
2001	Sultan Mahmud Babu	Bangladesh Nationalist Party
2008	Faridul Haq Khan	Awami League
2026	Sultan Mahmud Babu	Bangladesh Nationalist Party

== Elections ==
=== Elections in the 2020s ===
General Election 2026: Jamalpur-2
Party	Candidate	Votes	%	±%
BNP	Sultan Mahmud Babu	95,860	59.8	N/A
Jamaat	Md. Chamiul Haque	62,434	39.0	N/A
IAB	Sultan Mahmud	1,713	1.1	N/A
Independent	Arnab Wares Khan	174	0.1	N/A
Majority		33,426	20.9	N/A
Turnout		160,181	56.8	N/A
BNP gain from AL				

=== Elections in the 2010s ===
General Election 2014: Jamalpur-2
Party	Candidate	Votes	%	±%
AL	M. Faridul Haq Khan	112,809	97.1	+36.2
Independent	Md. Atikur Rahman	3,380	2.9	N/A
Majority		109,429	94.2	+68.3
Turnout		116,189	59.4	−28.2
AL hold				

=== Elections in the 2000s ===
General Election 2008: Jamalpur-2
Party	Candidate	Votes	%	±%
AL	M. Faridul Haq Khan	108,847	60.9	+22.9
BNP	Sultan Mahmud Babu	62,635	35.1	−26.1
Independent	Md. Javed Mosharaf	4,020	2.3	N/A
CPB	Manjurul Ahsan Khan	3,094	1.7	+0.9
Majority		46,212	25.9	+2.7
Turnout		178,596	87.6	+21.0
AL gain from BNP				

General Election 2001: Jamalpur-2
Party	Candidate	Votes	%	±%
BNP	Sultan Mahmud Babu	80,314	61.2	+23.3
AL	Rashed Mosharraf	49,865	38	−5.6
CPB	Md. Aslam Khan	1,032	0.8	−6.5
Majority		30,449	23.2	+17.5
Turnout		131,211	66.6	−0.9
BNP gain from AL				

=== Elections in the 1990s ===
General Election June 1996: Jamalpur-2
Party	Candidate	Votes	%	±%
AL	Rashed Mosharraf	41,816	43.6	+2.0
BNP	Sultan Mahmud Babu	36,344	37.9	+0.7
Jamaat	Samiul Haque Faruki	7,088	7.4	−10.4
CPB	Manjurul Ahsan Khan	6,992	7.3	N/A
JP(E)	Qamruzzaman Pahloan	3,555	3.7	+1.2
Zaker Party	S. M. Abdul Mannan	223	0.2	0.0
Majority		5,472	5.7	+1.3
Turnout		96,018	67.5	+20.7
AL hold				

General Election 1991: Jamalpur-2
Party	Candidate	Votes	%	±%
AL	Rashed Mosharraf	33,919	41.6	
BNP	Sultan Mahmud Babu	30,358	37.2	
Jamaat	Samiul Haq	14,487	17.8	
JP(E)	Ashraf Ud-Doullah Pahloan	1,998	2.5	
Bangladesh Muslim League (Kader)	Solaiman Sarkar	355	0.4	
Jatiya Samajtantrik Dal-JSD	A. Razzak	224	0.3	
Zaker Party	Khan Golam Baset	173	0.2	
Majority		3,561	4.4	
Turnout		81,514	46.8	
AL gain from JP(E)				
