= Abdul Jubbar Pahlowan =

Bengali politician (1895 – 1976)

Maulvi Md. Abdul Jabbar Pahlowan
- আব্দুল জব্বার পাহলোয়ান

Member of the Bengal Legislative Council
- In office 1921–1937
- Monarch: Edward VIII

Member of the Bengal Legislative Assembly
- In office 1937–1945
- Monarch: George VI
- Constituency: Jamalpur North

Personal details
- Born: 16 December 1895 Chinaiduli, Jamalpur subdivision, Mymensingh district, Bengal Presidency
- Died: Dhaka, Bangladesh 16 April 1976 (aged 80)
- Resting place: Guthail Bazar, Islampur
- Party: Swaraj Party
- Children: Ashraf Ud-Doullah Pahloan

Md. Abdul Jabbar Pahlowan (Bengali: মোহাম্মদ আব্দুল জব্বার পাহলোয়ান; 16 December 1895 – 16 April 1976) was a Bengali politician who served as a member in both the Bengal Legislative Council and the Bengal Legislative Assembly.

== Early life and education ==
Pahlowan was born on 16 December 1895 to a Bengali family from Chinaiduli in Islampur, Jamalpur subdivision, Mymensingh district, Bengal Presidency. He was the only son of Abul Mansur Palwan. His family was one of the few Muslim families at the time to attain the status of an elite political family.

Palwan began his education at the Guthail Minor English School. He then enrolled at the Jamalpur Government School, but was later expelled due to his involvement in the independence movement. After that, he enrolled at the Mrityunjayi School in Mymensingh where he passed his entrance examinations for seven subjects.

== Career ==
Palwan participated in the 1920 Indian general election, which was the first set of elections in the subcontinent's modern history. He won a seat in the Mymensingh East constituency as an independent candidate. Aged only 26 years, he became the youngest member of the Bengal Legislative Council. For the 1923 Indian general election, he joined the Swaraj Party. His campaign expenditure was 1203 taka whereas his main rival Syed Nawab Ali Chowdhury's expenditure was 3608 taka. Palwan won that election despite a huge cost difference and managed to regain his seat. In the assembly, he presented his arguments for reducing the price of quinine. On 21 November 1921, Palwan strongly condemned and protested the indiscriminate firing by the police on the people during the hartal in Calcutta. He was elected to the Jamalpur North constituency at the 1937 Bengal elections. He was introducing a bill to tax the income of landlords.

== Personal life ==
Palwan was the father of eleven sons and three daughters. His fourth son, Ashraf Ud-Doullah Pahloan, was a member of the Jatiya Sangsad.

== Death ==
Palwan died in Dhaka, Bangladesh on 16 April 1976.
