= Masjid-e-Noor (Baksiganj) =

Mosque in Jamalpur, Bangladesh

Coordinates: 25°10′21.4″N 89°52′26.0″E

- মসজিদে নূর
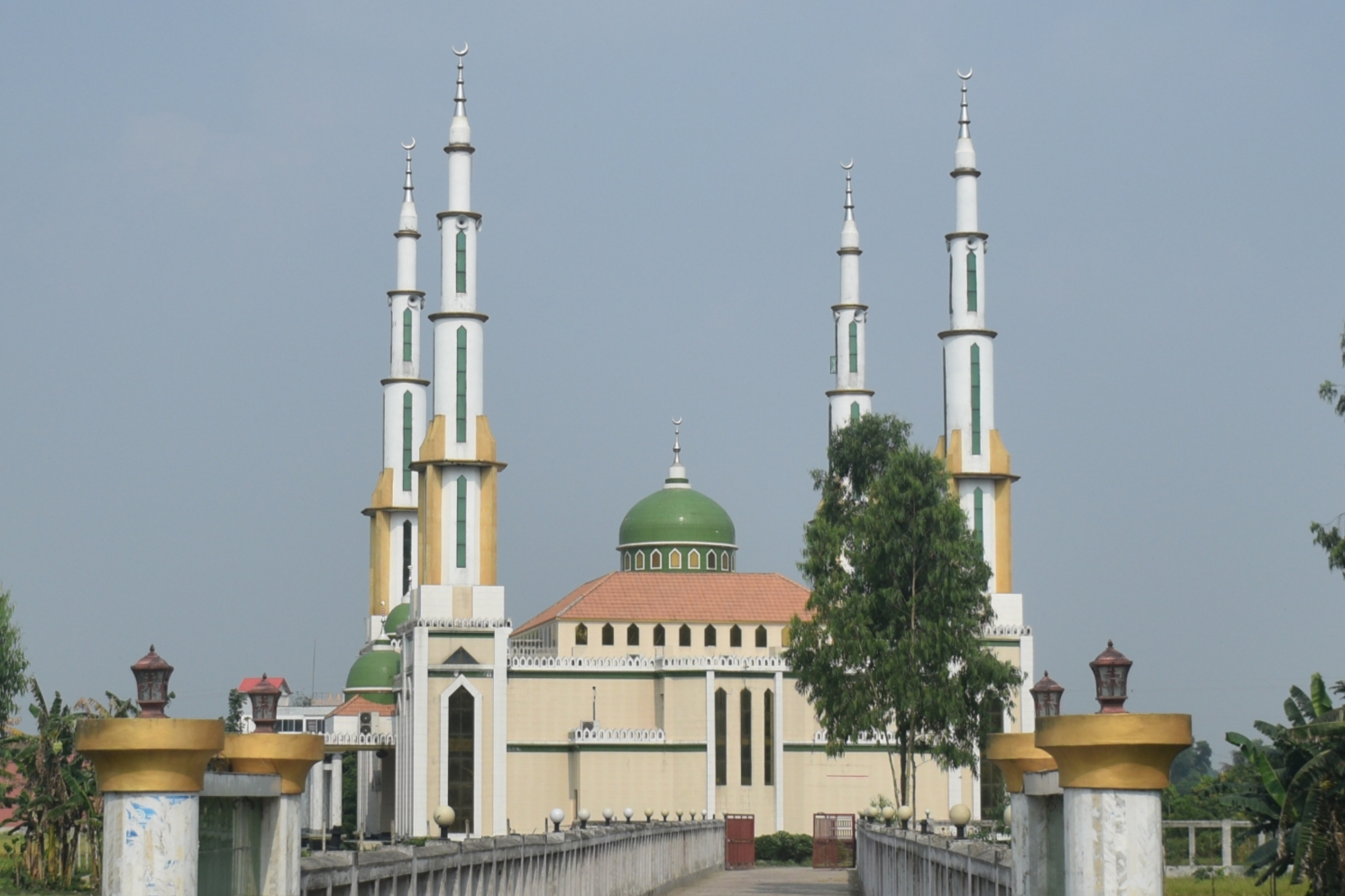

Religion
- Affiliation: Islam
- District: Jamalpur District
- Status: Active

Location
- Location: Doripara, Bakshiganj Upazila
- Country: Bangladesh
- Interactive map of Masjid-e-Noor

Architecture
- Style: Ottoman
- Funded by: Mahbubul Haque Chisti
- Established: May 11, 2018; 8 years ago

Specifications
- Capacity: 2500
- Dome: 7
- Minaret: 4
- Materials: Marbel

Masjid-e-Noor (Bengali: মসজিদে নূর) is a congregational mosque located in the Daripara area of Baksiganj Upazila, Jamalpur, at the entrance of the town on the right side of the Jamalpur-Baksiganj road. Following the Ottoman architectural style of Turkey, the structure is made of marble and has a capacity of about 2,500. The two-storied, boundary-enclosed mosque was built with the personal funding of local Mahbubul Haque Chishti. The official inauguration of the mosque took place on May 11, 2018.

== Description ==
Masjid-e-Noor is primarily a two-story building. It is connected to the main road by a 500-meter access road. Besides being surrounded by flower and fruit gardens, the mosque campus also contains car parking, a retirement home, an orphanage, and a madrasa. The ablution area is outside the main mosque. The open spaces of the structure, enclosed by boundary walls, are filled with pine trees. Chandeliers hang from the ceiling of the main prayer hall. The mosque, including the lower main prayer hall and the second floor, can accommodate up to two and a half thousand people praying together.

== Architecture ==
Mosjid-e-Noor, which is built on 5 acres of land, follows the Ottoman architectural style of the Turkey. The main foundation or floor is covered with marble stone tiles. The interior walls are decorated with various designs. The main large dome is located at the exact center of the mosque on the roof. In addition, there are six other domes, making a total of seven, and four tall minarets. Various patterns are installed inside the central dome. Three different doors have been provided for people to enter.

== Gallery ==
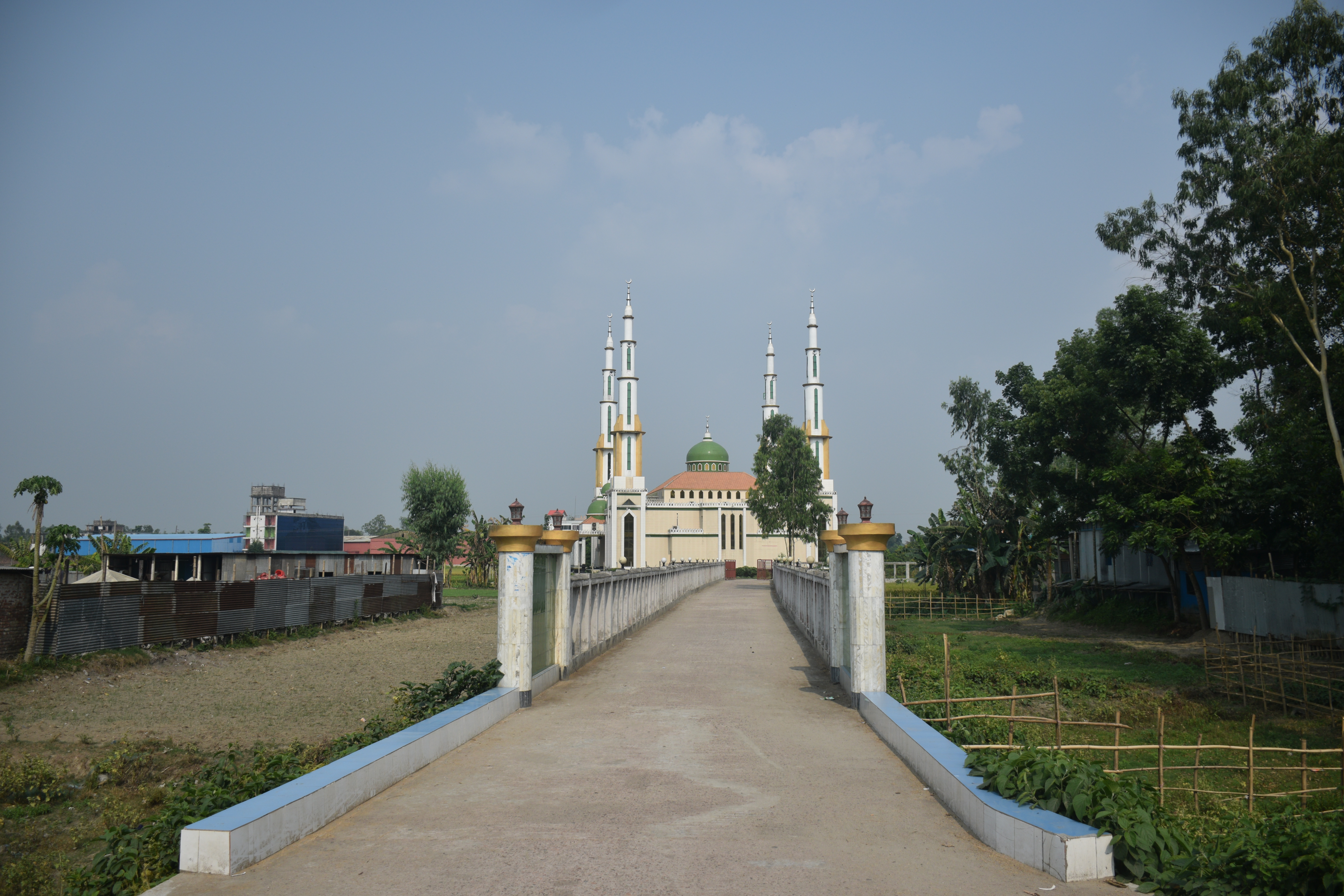
connecting road to mosque

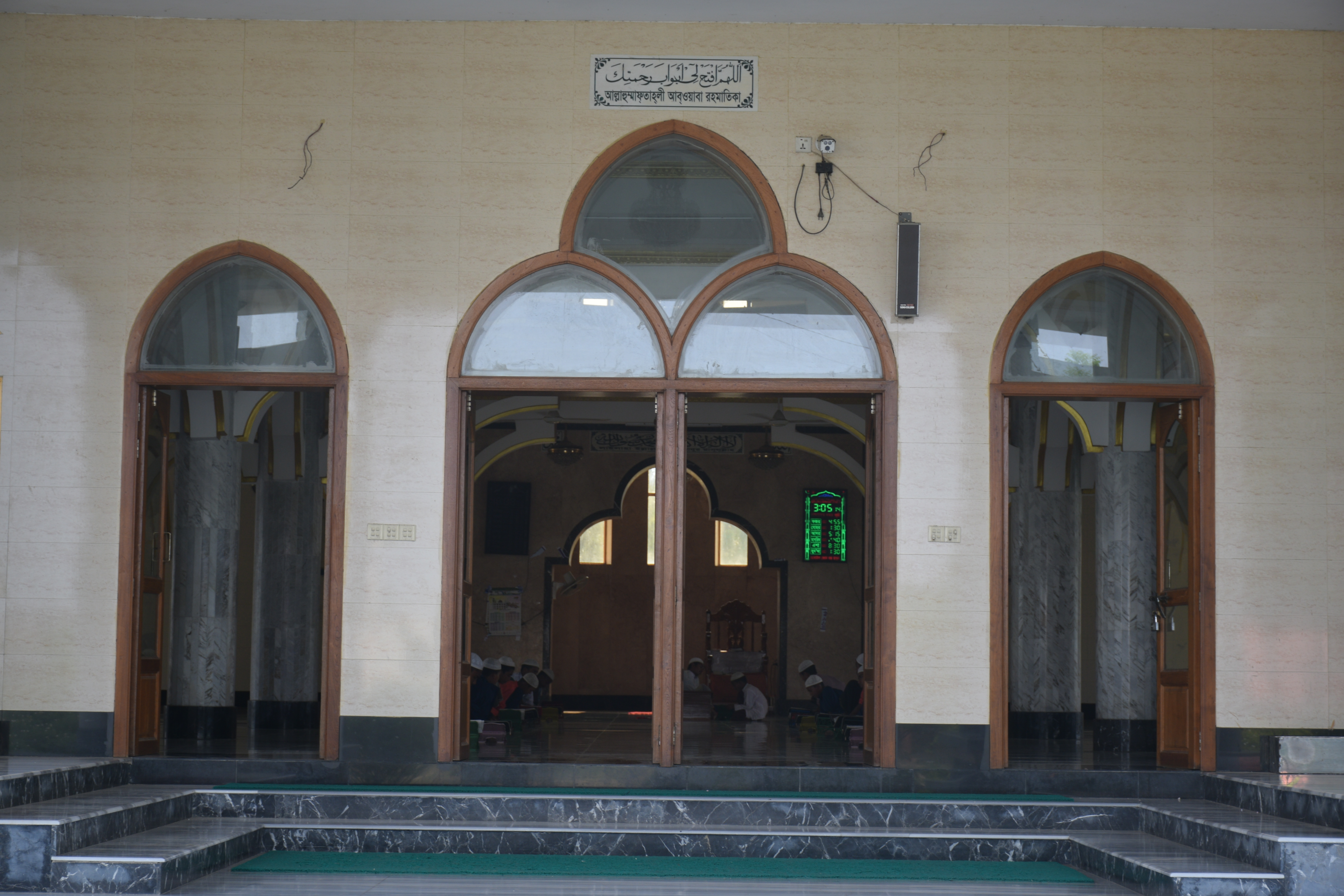
main entrance

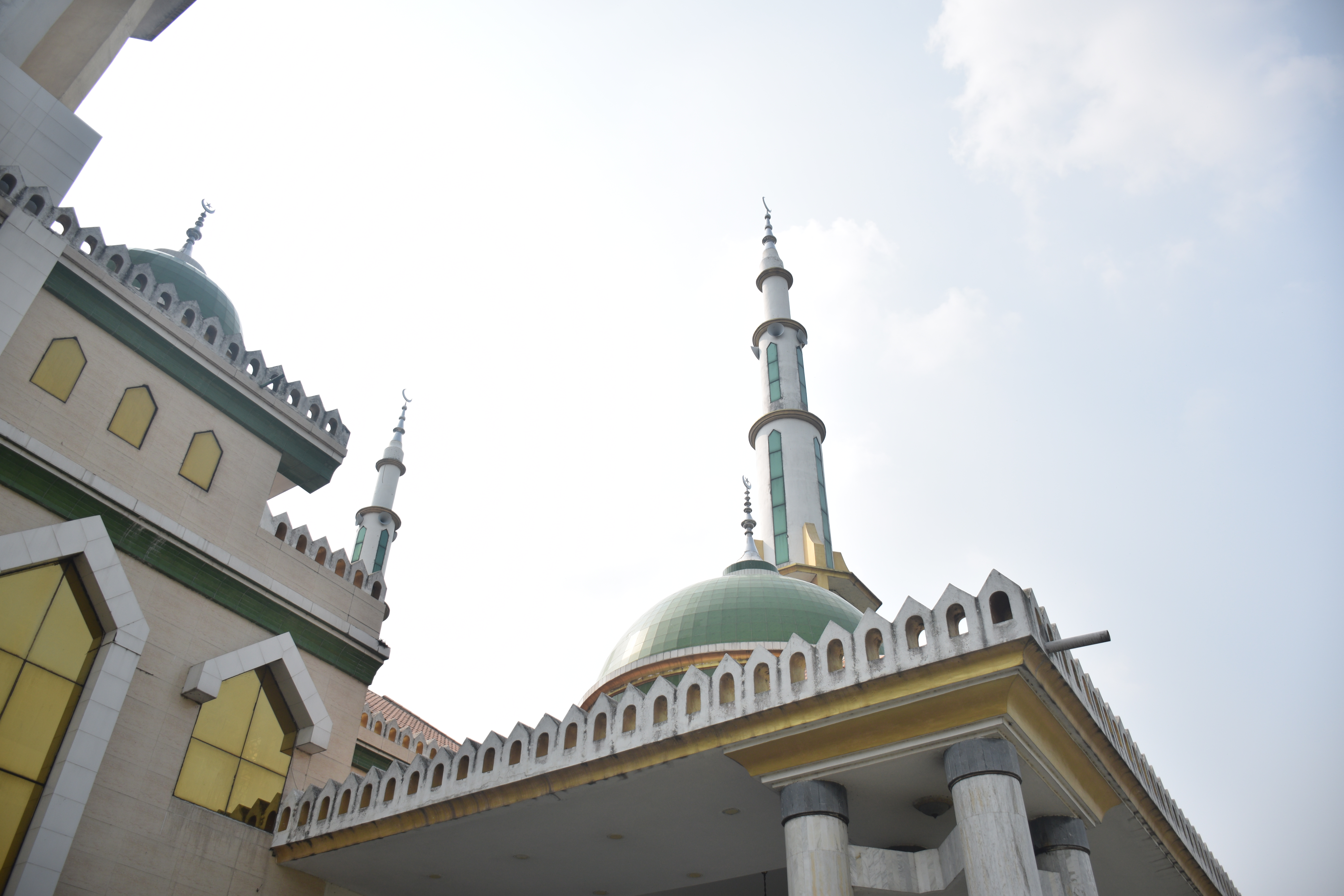
partial view of minaret and dome
