= Faridul Haq Khan =

Bangladeshi politician

Md. Faridul Haq Khan
- মো: ফরিদুল হক খান
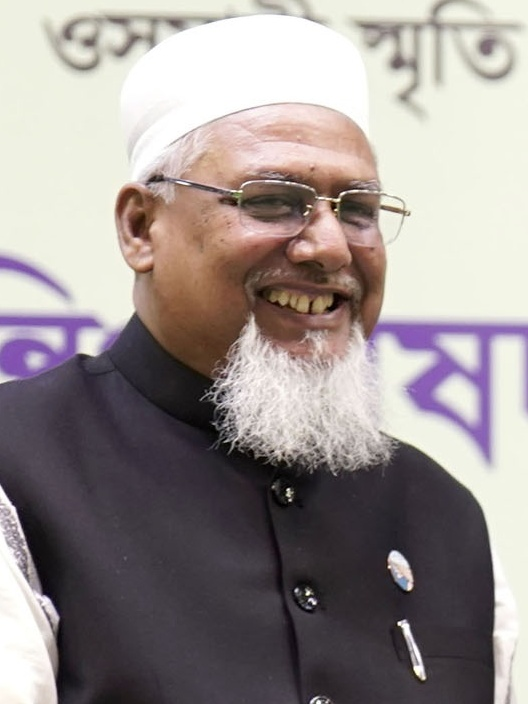
- Khan in 2023

Minister of Religious Affairs
- In office 11 January 2024 – 6 August 2024
- Prime Minister: Sheikh Hasina
- Preceded by: Motiur Rahman
- Succeeded by: A F M Khalid Hossain

Member of the Bangladesh Parliament for Jamalpur-2
- In office 12 January 2009 – 6 August 2024
- Preceded by: Sultan Mahmud Babu

Minister of State for Religious Affairs
- In office 24 Nov 2020 – 10 January 2024
- Prime Minister: Sheikh Hasina
- Preceded by: Sheikh Mohammed Abdullah
- Succeeded by: Vacant

Personal details
- Born: 2 January 1956 (age 70) Uttar Shirajbad, Islampur, Jamalpur District, East Pakistan
- Party: Bangladesh Awami League
- Nickname: Dulal

Md. Faridul Haq Khan is a Bangladesh Awami League politician, a former minister of religious affairs, and a former Jatiya Sangsad member representing the Jamalpur-2 constituency.

== Early life ==
Khan was born on 2 January 1956 in Uttar Shirajbad, Islampur, Jamalpur District, East Pakistan. He studied up to high school, completing his HSC.

== Career ==
Khan was elected to parliament from Jamalpur-2 as a candidate of the Bangladesh Awami League. He beat Sultan Mahmud Babu, the candidate of Bangladesh Nationalist Party, to win the election. On 24 November 2020 he takes oath as state minister for religious affairs.
