= Islampur Municipality =

Municipality in Mymensingh, Bangladesh

Coordinates: 25.0895°N 89.7811°E

Islampur Municipality ইসলামপুর পৌরসভা
- Municipality
- Interactive map of Islampur Municipality

Area
  - Total: 14.71 km^{2} (5.68 sq mi)

Population
  - Total: 35,427

Islampur Municipality mahallah geocode map

Islampur Municipality (Bengali: ইসলামপুর পৌরসভা, lit. 'Islampur Municipality') is a municipality of Islampur in Mymensingh, Bangladesh.

== History ==
Islampur Municipality was established in 1998.
