= Sultan Mahmud Babu =

Bangladeshi politician

- সুলতান মাহমুদ বাবু

Member of Parliament
- In office 17 February 2026
- In office 15 February 1996 – Jun 1996
- Preceded by: Rashed Mosharraf
- Succeeded by: Rashed Mosharraf
- In office 2nd
- In office 10 october 2001 – 29 october 2006
- Preceded by: Rashed Mosharraf
- Succeeded by: M. Faridul Haq Khan

Personal details
- Party: Bangladesh Nationalist Party

Sultan Mahmud Babu (born 31 March 1955) is a Bangladesh Nationalist Party politician and the former Member of Parliament from Jamalpur-2. He continues to serve in various leadership roles at the upazila, district, and national levels within the party.

== Early life ==
A. E. Sultan Mahmud Babu was born on 31 March 1955 in Sarkar Para, Gaibandha, under Islampur Upazila of Jamalpur District. He is the son of Alhaj Shams Uddin Ahmed and Alhaj Nasimunnesa.

He completed his SSC from Mohammadpur Government High School (1971–1972) and HSC from Suhrawardy College (1973–1974). Babu received a B.Sc in Chemistry from the University of Dhaka (1975–1980).

After a long break in academic life, he resumed higher studies and completed:

- B.A (Hons) in English Literature – Darul Ihsan University (2012)
- M.A in English Literature – Darul Ihsan University (2013)
- MBA – American Bangladesh University (2015)

== Career ==
Sultan Mahmud Babu has been active in BNP politics for several decades. He contested the national parliamentary elections in 1991, 1996, 2001, and 2018 as the BNP candidate from Jamalpur-2 (Islampur). He served in the parliamentary standing committee on Housing and Public Works Ministry.

He has held significant party positions, including:

- President, BNP Upazila Committee (Islampur)
- Vice President, BNP District Committee (Jamalpur)
- Member, BNP National Executive Committee

== Political Activism ==
For the past 16 years, Babu has taken part in various political movements, particularly those initiated by the BNP against what the party describes as autocratic or one-party rule in Bangladesh. He has remained an active participant in national and local-level demonstrations.

== Early Political Activities (1980s–1990s) ==
Sultan Mahmud Babu’s political journey began more than three decades ago. During the 1980s, he was involved with several political groups in the Islampur and Sindurmari areas.

His early political activities focused on strengthening party organization, mobilizing youth, and representing community issues. This foundational period established his reputation as a dedicated grassroots organizer.

== Member of Parliament (2001–2006) ==
Babu was elected as the Member of Parliament for Jamalpur-2 in the 2001 national election by a significant margin.

His five-year tenure is remembered for a wide range of development initiatives across the Islampur region.

== Development Initiatives (Reported by Local Sources) ==
According to local accounts, numerous development projects were completed during his tenure, including:

- Construction of 35 bridges and culverts
- Rehabilitation and development of 14 educational institutions
- Allocation of 10 crore BDT for technical institutes
- Allocation of 4 crore BDT in T.I. (Training/Technical) sectors
- Agricultural improvements, including 700 drilling units and 6000 bailing field upgrades
- 8 km rural electrification expansion
- Infrastructure development using parliamentary and LGED funds
- 3 crore BDT allocated for the construction of Anlon School and Ideal School
- Approximately 45 km of road development
- Development of mosques, temples, markets, and social/religious facilities
- Establishment of two agricultural banks, distribution of agricultural machinery, and implementation of housing projects
- Improved communication networks through expanded telecom coverage
- Growth of small and medium electric-powered industries

These initiatives contributed significantly to improvements in communication, education, electrification, agriculture, and local commerce in the region.

== Later Political Role ==
After 2006, political instability and various attacks and legal cases increased tension in the Islampur area. Supporters claim that Sultan Mahmud Babu played an important role in maintaining party structure, protecting activists, and sustaining political organization during these challenging years.

For the past 17–18 years, he has remained engaged in organizational, social, and political activities aimed at preserving stability and party unity in the region.
