= Jamalpur Rural Development Academy =

Rural Development Academy in Bangladesh

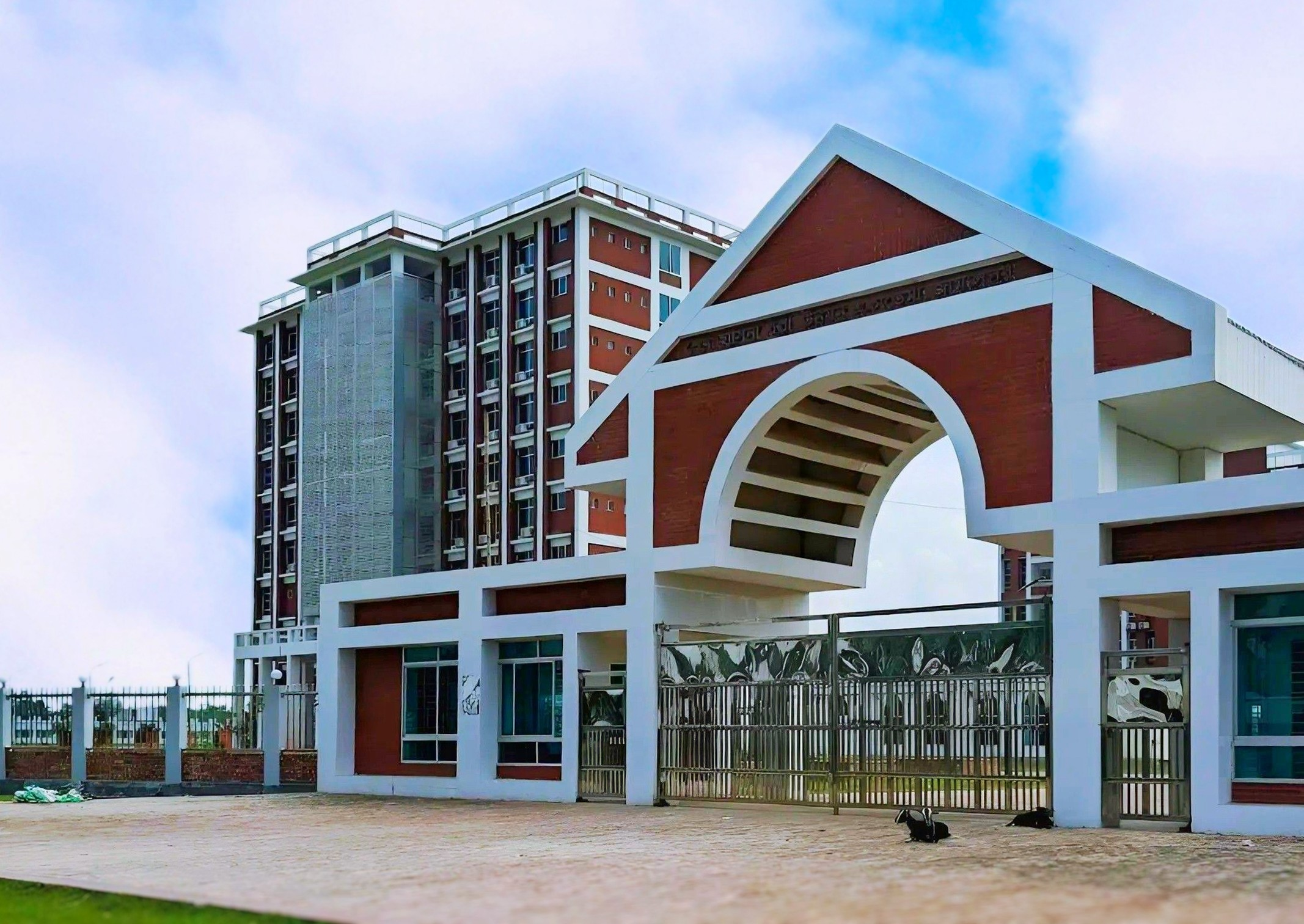
- Main gate
- Formerly: Jamalpur Rural Development Academy
- Company type: Rural Development Academy
- Founded: 2023; 3 years ago
- Headquarters: Jamalpur, Bangladesh
- Key people: Mohammad Anwar Hossain
- Website: rda.jamalpur.gov.bd/en

Jamalpur Rural Development Academy (জামালপুর পল্লী উন্নয়ন একাডেমী) is a specialized institution in rural development and poverty alleviation, located in Jamalpur District, Mymensingh Division, Bangladesh. It aims at improving the skills of the rural population through training, research, and application-oriented activities.

== History ==
Jamalpur Rural Development Academy was established through the Sheikh Hasina Rural Development Academy, Jamalpur Bill, 2023 passed by the Parliament of Bangladesh in 2023.

== Academic functions ==
An Act to establish Sheikh Hasina Rural Development Academy, Jamalpur (Act No. 27 of 2023).

- Conducting research in rural development and related fields.
- Provide subject-based training to government employees and persons engaged in private jobs, local government representatives and individuals concerned with rural development.
- Experimentation and, as the case may be, implementation of concepts and theories of rural development.
- Preparation, implementation and evaluation of technical research, projects and programs related to rural development.
- Provide necessary advice and advisory services to the government and other agencies in response to their needs.
- Assisting and supervising domestic and foreign students.
- Undertaking joint programs on rural development with domestic, foreign or international research, education and training institutions with the approval of the government.
- Conduct research activities, including field work, on their own initiative or on behalf of the government or any other organization or jointly with them.
- Organizing and conducting national and international seminars, conferences, workshops.
- Creation of different departments, sub-disciplines, branches, centers and other units within the institution at different times for the smooth functioning of the academy.
- Publication of books, periodicals, reports and research papers.
- To assist the Government in formulating policies for rural development.
- Organizing skill development training for beneficiaries for the purpose of self-employment and entrepreneurship creation.
- Formulation of consultancy service policies related to training, research, applied research and lending.

== See also ==
- Rural Development Academy
- Bangladesh Academy for Rural Development
- Rural development
