= Mudassir Hossain =

Bengali politician

Khan Bahadur Mudassir Hossain C.I.E

Member of the Bengal Legislative Assembly
- In office 1937–1946
- Succeeded by: Mohammad Abdur Rasheed
- Constituency: Birbhum

Personal details
- Born: Burdwan district, Bengal Presidency
- Awards: Khan Bahadur, C.I.E

Khan Bahadur Mudassir Hossain was a Bengali politician.

== Early life ==
Hossain was born into a Bengali Muslim family in Rampurhat, Birbhum district, Bengal Presidency.

== Career ==
Hossain was a member of the Bengal Legislative Council in 1921. He was awarded Khan Bahadur and CIE by the British Raj. Hossain contested in the 1937 Bengal elections and won a seat at the Bengal Legislative Assembly. He was opposed to Marxism and remained in India after the Partition of Bengal (1947), although he reportedly expressed desire for all of Bengal to join the Dominion of Pakistan.
