= Karimuzzaman Talukder =

Bangladeshi politician

Member of Bangladesh Parliament
- In office 1979–1986
- Succeeded by: Rashed Mosharraf

Personal details
- Party: Awami League

Karimuzzaman Talukder is a Bangladesh Nationalist Party politician and a former member of parliament for Jamalpur-3.

== Career ==
Talukder was elected to parliament from Jamalpur-3 as a Bangladesh Nationalist Party candidate in 1979.
