= Pithali =

Dish from the Jamalpur District, Bangladesh

Pithali or Mənda (also known as Milli Bhaat and Milani) is a savoury dish originating from the Jamalpur District in Mymensingh Division, Bangladesh. It is most commonly prepared during religious and social occasions, including weddings, aqiqah, and milads. The dish is often considered a symbol of Jamalpur's culinary identity, described in the Dhaka Tribune as Jamalpur's "signature food item". It is popular in both urban and rural settings.

The primary ingredients include bone-in beef, potatoes, onions, garlic, and a mixture of ground spices such as turmeric, cumin, cardamom, and cinnamon. Variants using shrimp or vegetables also exist in some households. Before serving, a tempering of fried onions and ground roasted cumin is often added for flavour and aroma. Pithali is usually eaten with warm cooked rice.

While "Pithali" and Mənda are the most common terms, alternative names such as Milli and Mindali are used in different parts of Jamalpur, depending on household or local dialects. Despite the name's phonetic similarity to "pitha" (which typically refers to sweet rice cakes in Bengali cuisine), Pithali is entirely savoury.

Pithali is believed to have been popular in the region since at least the 18th century, though its precise origin is undocumented. Some culinary historians suggest that the dish may have evolved through regional adaptations during the British colonial period. Today, it continues to be a significant element in local food culture and is passed down through generations, especially in Jamalpur Sadar and neighbouring areas.
