= Abdus Sattar (Jamalpur politician) =

Bangladeshi politician

Member of Bangladesh Parliament

Personal details
- Party: Jatiya Party (Ershad)

Abdus Sattar is a Jatiya Party (Ershad) politician and a former member of parliament for Jamalpur-1.

== Career ==
Sattar was elected to parliament from Jamalpur-1 as a Jatiya Party candidate in 1986 and 1988.
