= Dewanganj Upazila =

Dewanganj দেওয়ানগঞ্জ
- Upazila
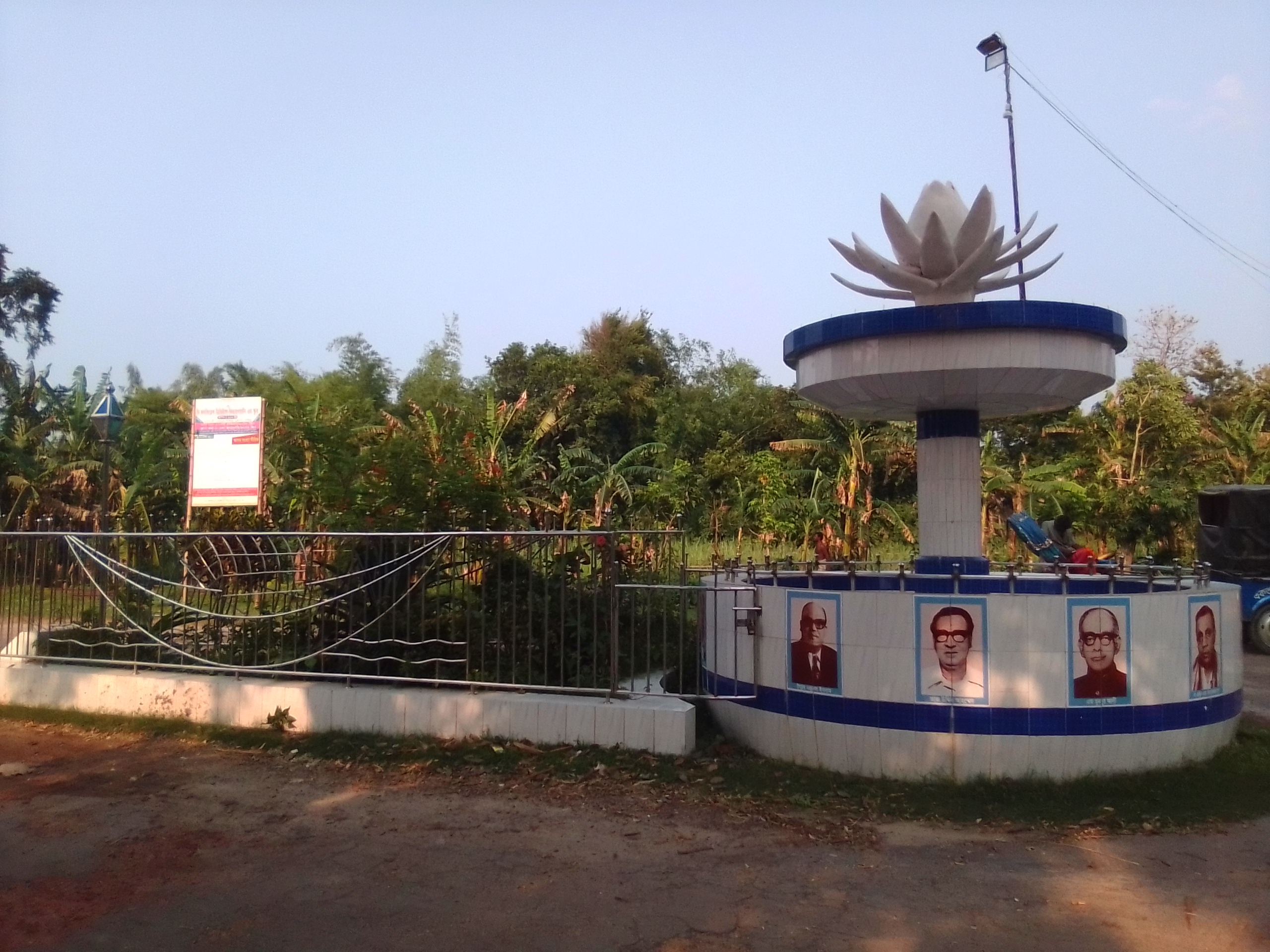
- Shapla symbol in Dewanganj

- Coordinates: 25.1417°N 89.7833°E
- Country: Bangladesh
- Division: Mymensingh Division
- District: Jamalpur District

Area
  - Total: 267.51 km^{2} (103.29 sq mi)

Population (2022)
  - Total: 288,166
  - Density: 1,077.2/km^{2} (2,790.0/sq mi)
- Time zone: UTC+6 (BST)
- Postal code: 2030
- Area code: 0981
- Website: dewangonj.jamalpur.gov.bd

Dewanganj Upazila mauza geocode map

Dewanganj (Bengali: দেওয়ানগঞ্জ) is an Upazila of Jamalpur District, Mymensingh Division, Bangladesh. It covers an area of 266.59 km^{2} (102.93 sq mi).

== History ==
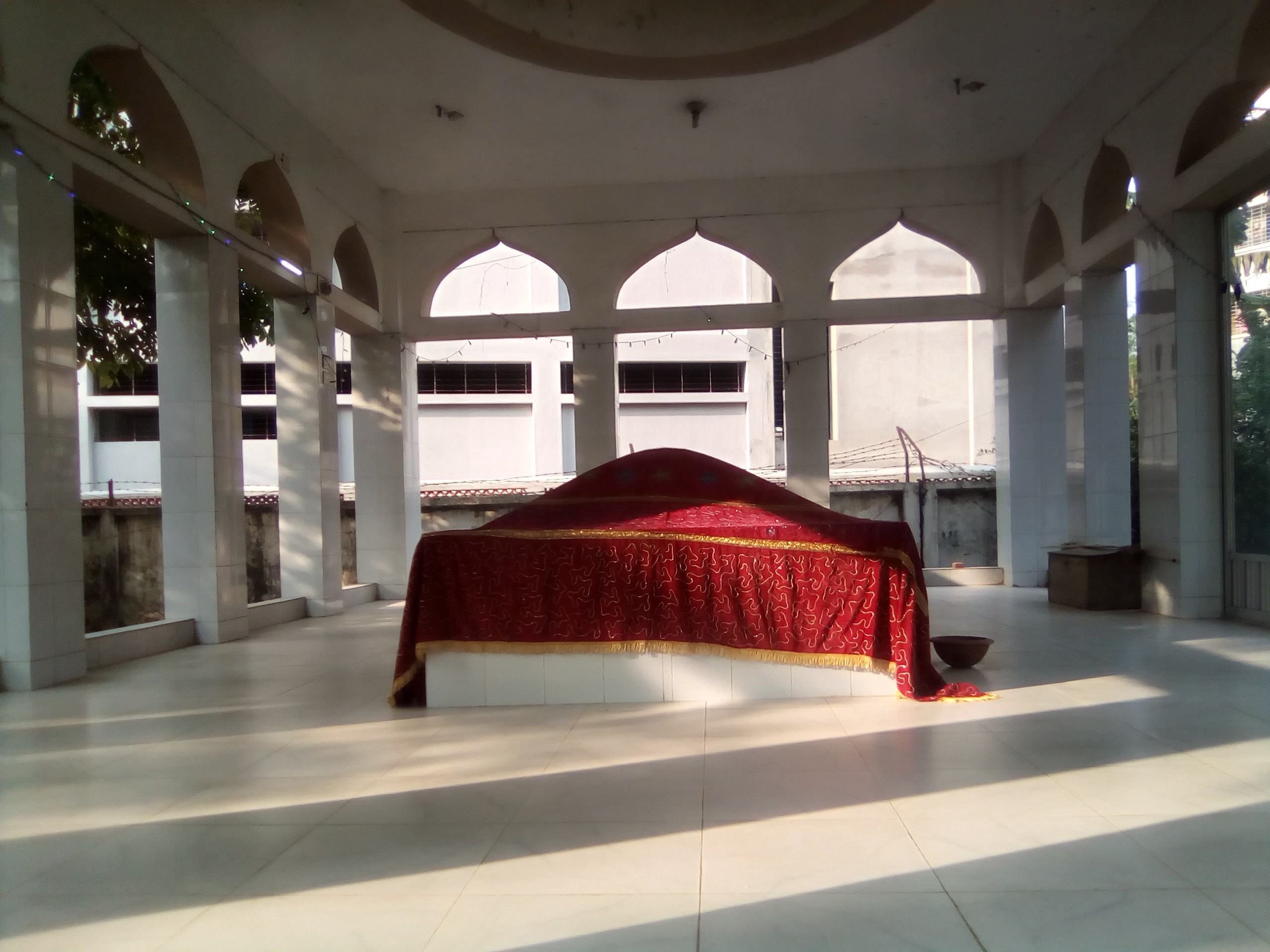
Mughal-era mazar (mausoleum) of Hazrat Dewan Shah

Dewanganj was first called 'Paddat Nagar,' named after a Hindu landlord. During the Mughal period, two saints, Dewan Shah Kamal and Dewan Shah Jamal, spread Islam in the area. Dewanganj is named after these two saints. In 1772, it was under Rangpur District. Then, in 1821, it was shifted to Bogura District. In 1866, it was shifted to Jamalpur Subdivision under Mymensingh District. Bahadurabad Ghat of this upazila was a very important place in the northern sector due to its strategic location.

In 1971, the Pakistani Army deployed one platoon of soldiers of the 31st Baluch Regiment, one company of para-military Rangers Forces and about 50 Razakars to keep full control over the Bahadurabad Ghat along with the Jamuna River. On July 3, 1971, a group of 400 Freedom Fighters attacked the Bahadurabad Ghat, under the command of Major Shafayet Jamil. The Pakistani Army was defeated in this three-day battle. With this victory, the Freedom Fighters were able to disrupt the railway communication between Jamalpur and Bahadurabaad Ghat.

== Geography ==
Dewanganj is located at 25.1417°N 89.7833°E. It has 60,716 households and a total area of 267.51 km^{2}. There are four main rivers passing through Dewanganj: Jamuna, Brahmaputra, Jingiram and the old Brahammaputra rivers. It is bordered by Kurigram district of Rangpur division to the north, Meghalaya state of India and Bakshiganj upazila to the east, Islampur upazila to the south, and Gaibandha district of Rangpur division to the west.

== Demographics ==
Historical population
Year	Pop. (000)	±%
1991	193,182	—
2001	229,307	+18.7%
2011	258,133	+12.6%
2022	288,166	+11.6%
Source: Bangladesh Bureau of Statistics

Religions in Dewanganj Upazila (2022)
Religion	Percent
Islam	98.43%
Hinduism	1.55%
Other or not stated	0.02%

According to the 2022 Bangladeshi census, Dewanganj Upazila had 62,687 households and a population of 288,166. 10.02% of the population were under 5 years of age. Dewanganj had a literacy rate (age 7 and over) of 59.39%: 61.38% for males and 57.49% for females, and a sex ratio of 97.05 males for 100 females. 72,070 (25.01%) lived in urban areas.

== Economy ==
Zeal-Bangla sugar mill is situated in Mill Bazar near Dewanganj railway station. The main crops are paddy, jute, sugarcane, mustard seed, wheat, potato, garlic, cabbage, cauliflower, brinjal, varieties of pulse and vegetables. Extinct or nearly extinct crops Ground nut, kaun. Main fruits Mango, banana, coconut, watermelon and futi.

Fisheries, dairies, poultry cattle breeding farm 1, hatchery 1. cottage industries loom 1400, handicraft 39, blacksmith 72, potteries 11, bamboo and cane work 71, wood work 159, painter 7, jute and cotton work 96 and tailoring 200.

Main occupations are agriculture 39.34%, fishing 1.81%, agricultural labourer 28.77%, wage labourer 3.76%, commerce 9.44%, service 5.69% and others 11.19%.Land use Total cultivable land 16385.27 hectares, fallow land 2554.03 hectares; single crop 16.67%, double crop 45.86% and treble crop 9.81%; land under irrigation 771.35 hectares. Land control among the peasants: 14.04% are landless, 40.96% marginal, 27.82% small, 13.58% intermediate and 3.60% rich; cultivable land per head is 0.18 hectare. Value of land The market value of the land of the first grade is Taka 7500 per 0.01 hectare.

Hats and bazars are 33, most noted are Dewanganj bazar, Bahadurabad Bazar, Zalorchor Bazar under Bahadurabad Union. Now it is the biggest bazar in Dewanganj Upazila. Sananda Bari Bazar, Kathebil Bazar (the centre of Dewangonj thana), Moulvir char bazar, fair 1 (Baruni Mela at Chaitra Samkranti) every year also observed Pahela Baishakh and arranged Mela at Sananda Bari High School yard. Bashtoli Bazar,(its very popular for morning marketing, Tashins home at this place), Mitaly Bazzar (one of the best commercial places in this upazila).

== Administration ==
Jamalpur Sadar Thana was formed in 1853 and it was turned into an upazila 1983. Municipality was established in 1869.

Dewanganj Upazila is divided into Dewanganj Municipality and eight union parishads: Bahadurabad, Char Aomkhaoa, Chikajani, Chukaibari, Dangdhara, Dewanganj, Hatebhanga, and Par Ramrampur. The union parishads are subdivided into 39 mauzas and 166 villages.

== Infrastructure ==
=== Transport ===
Dewanganj is on the Narayanganj-Bahadurabad Ghat Line.

=== Health ===
Health centers Upazila health complex 1, family planning centre 8, satellite clinic 2.

== Education ==
University 1, colleges 2, government high school 1, non-government high schools 15, Madrasas 5, government primary schools 115, non-government primary schools 63.

Cultural organisations: Clubs 61, libraries 1, cinema halls 2, theatre group 1, literary societies 8, women's organisation 1, playgrounds 31.

Noted educational institutions: Dewangonj Government High School Dewangonj Girls High School, A.K memorial college, Estiak Hossan Didar Wemens College, (Taratia Al-haz Lal Mamud high School, Taratia Girls High School, Gazi Nasir Uddin Memorial College at taratia, par ramram pur union), Engineer Fozul Mohila college, Polly-technical College, Zeal-Bangla High School, Dewangonj Kamil Madrasah, Sananda Bari High School, Sananda Bari Degree College, M.M memorial College, Hatibhanga, Hativanga Afroza Begum High School, Moulovir Char High School, Moulovir Char Girls School. Bahadurabad High School, Bahadurabad A'rab Senior Madrasah, shahjadpur high school. Utmar Char Primary School, Utmar Char High School, Mitaly High School, Hosenpur Primary School, Pathorer Char Dip Shikha High School.
