= Nur Mohammad (Jamalpur politician) =

Bangladeshi politician

Member of the Bangladesh Parliament for Jamalpur-1
- In office 30 January 2024 – 6 August 2024
- Preceded by: Abul Kalam Azad

Personal details
- Born: 15 December 1959 (age 66)

Nur Mohammad (born 15 December 1959) is an Awami League politician and a former Jatiya Sangsad member representing the Jamalpur-1 constituency in 2024. He is currently serving at Bakshiganj Upazila Awami League. In June 2026, he was detained from Gulshan by the Dhaka Metropolitan Police.
