= Bengal Legislative Council =

Legislative Council of British Bengal (1861–1947)

Bengal Legislative Council বঙ্গীয় আইন পরিষদ

Type
- Type: Unicameral (1861–1937); Upper chamber (1937–1947)

History
- Founded: 1861
- Disbanded: 1947
- Succeeded by: East Bengal Legislative Assembly; West Bengal Legislative Assembly

Meeting place
- Vidhan Sabha Bhavan Calcutta

The Bengal Legislative Council (Bengali: বঙ্গীয় আইন পরিষদ) was the legislative council of Bengal Presidency. It was the legislature of the Bengal Presidency during the late 19th and early 20th centuries. After reforms were adopted in 1937, it served as the upper house of the Bengali legislature until the partition of India.

== History ==
The council was established under the Indian Councils Act 1861. It was dominated by Europeans and Anglo-Indians, with natives as a minority, until reforms in 1909. Under the Indian Councils Act 1892 and Indian Councils Act 1909, representatives of municipalities, district boards, city corporations, universities, ports, plantations, zamindars, Muslim electorates and chambers of commerce were inducted. Native Bengali representation gradually increased. Its voting power was limited, particularly on budgets. It was delegated "transferred subjects" of education, public health, local government, agriculture and public works; while the "reserved subjects" of finance, police, land revenue, law, justice and labour remained with the Executive Council headed by the Governor of Bengal. Between 1905 and 1912, the council's geographical coverage was divided and partly delegated to the Eastern Bengal and Assam Legislative Council. During the period of dyarchy, the council was boycotted by the Congress Party and Swaraj Party; but constitutionalists in the Bengal Provincial Muslim League continued to be active members.

Under the Government of India Act 1935, the council became the upper chamber of the legislature of Bengal.

== Membership ==
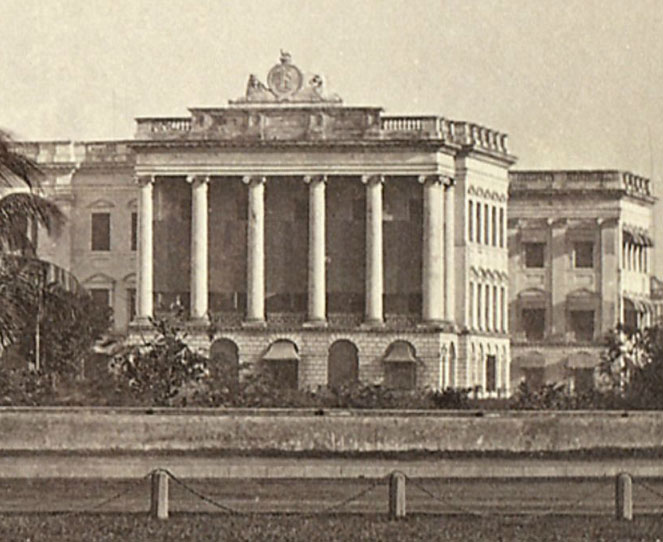
An image from the 1860s of Government House in Calcutta, where the Legislative Council met during its first decade

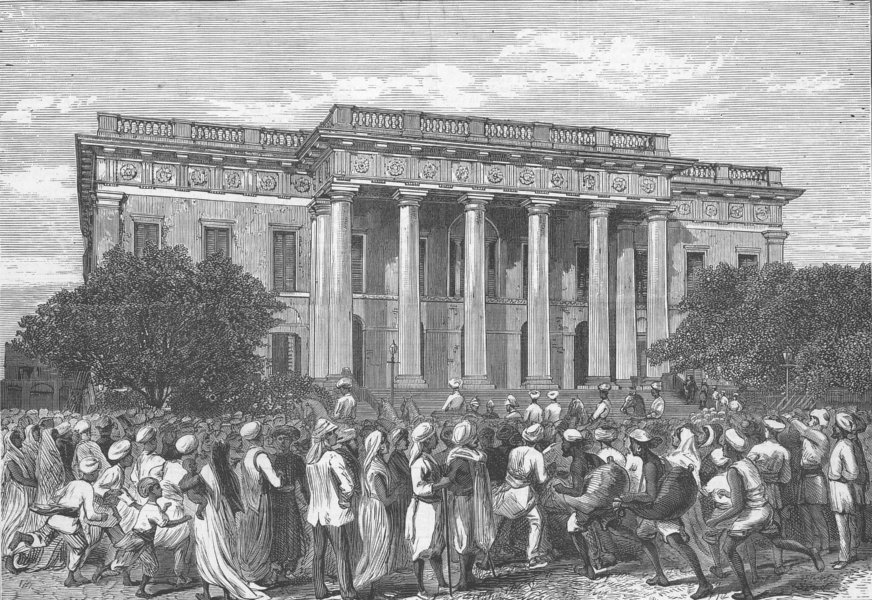
The Legislative Council also met in Calcutta Town Hall

The council grew from 12 members in 1862, to 20 in 1892, 53 in 1909, 140 in 1919 and 63–65 in 1935.

=== Indian Councils Act 1861 ===
Under the Indian Councils Act 1861, the council included 12 members nominated by the Lieutenant Governor of Bengal. The members included four government officials, four non-government Anglo-Indians and four Bengali gentlemen. From 1862 to 1893, 123 persons were nominated to the council, of whom only 49 were native Indian members, 35 were members of the British Indian Association and 26 were aristocrats.

=== Indian Councils Act 1892 ===
Under the Indian Councils Act 1892 (55 & 56 Vict. c. 14), the Lieutenant Governor could nominate seven members on the recommendation of the Bengal Chamber of Commerce, municipalities, district councils, the University of Calcutta and the Corporation of Calcutta.

Total members 20 [40% elected members] and [60% official]

=== Indian Councils Act 1909 ===
Under the Indian Councils Act 1909, the council had the following composition.

- Ex-officio members
  - Lieutenant Governor
  - Executive Councillors- 2
- Nominated members
  - Officials- 17 maximum
  - Indian commerce- 1
  - Planters- 1
  - Experts- 2
  - Others- 3 minimum
- Elected members
  - Corporation of Calcutta- 1
  - University of Calcutta- 1
  - Municipalities- 6
  - District boards- 6
  - Landholders- 5
  - Muhammadans- 4
  - Bengal Chamber of Commerce- 2
  - Calcutta Traders Association- 1

=== Government of India Act 1919 ===
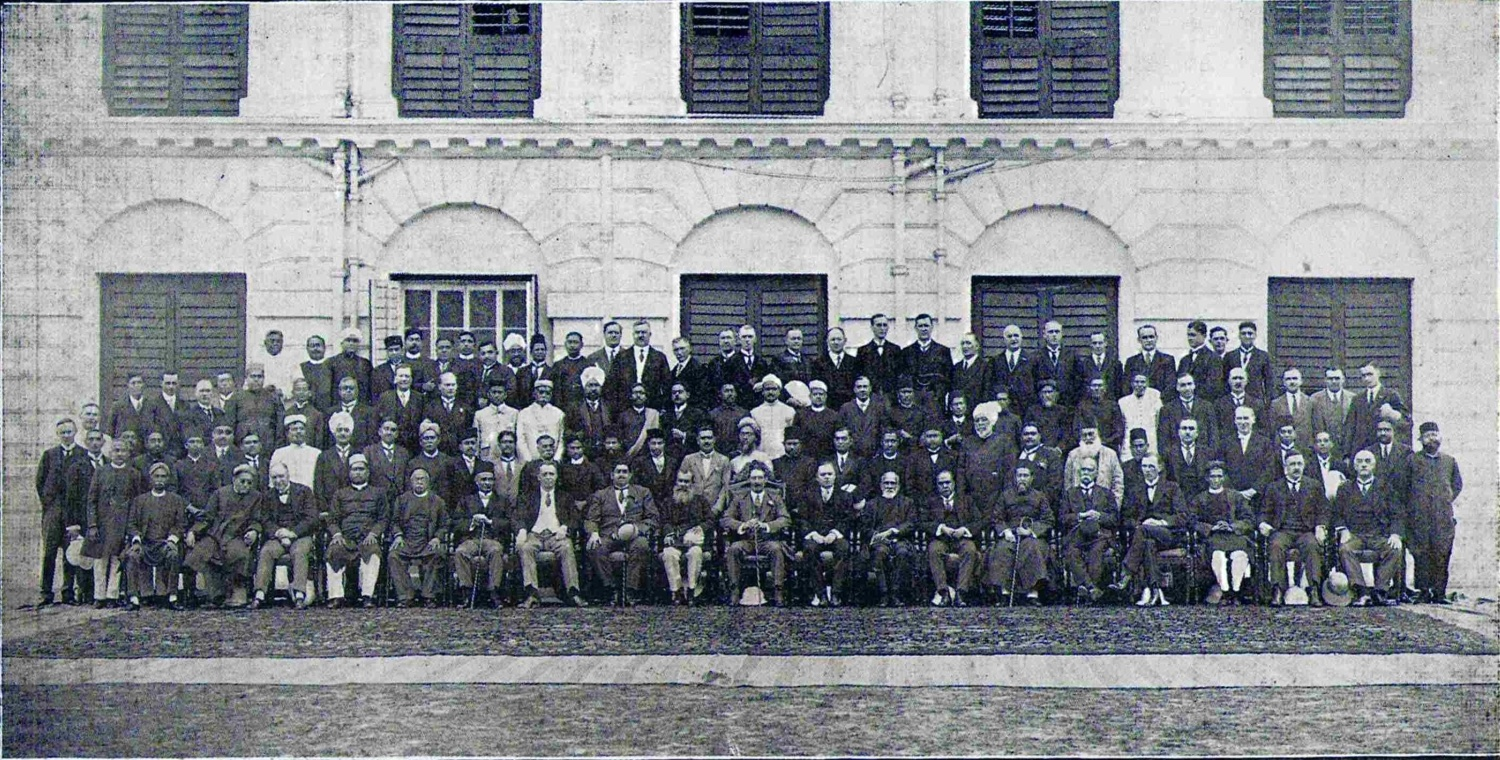
Members of the Bengal Legislative Council in 1921

Under the Government of India Act 1919, the council had 140 members. There were 92 seats assigned to general constituencies, divided into Muslim, non-Muslim, European, and Anglo-Indian sections. Another 22 seats were assigned to special electorates, namely landholders, the two universities, and commercial interests. The remaining 26 seats were filled by government nomination.

=== Government of India Act 1935 ===
As the upper chamber under the Government of India Act 1935, the council had the following composition.

- General elected seats – 10
- Muslim electorate seats – 17
- European electorate seats – 3
- Nominees of the Bengal Legislative Assembly – 27
- Nominees of the Governor of Bengal – 'not less than 6 and not more than 8'.

== Tenure ==
The legislative council was initially given a three-year tenure. It became a permanent body under the Government of India Act 1935, which required one third of its members to retire.

== Head of the council ==
The Lieutenant Governor was the ex-officio president of the council until 1909, when the council was given the right to elect its president and deputy president.

== Member list of the Bengal Legislative Council in 1921 ==
The principal officers of the Bengal Legislative Council.

President.

- Syed Shamsul Huda

Deputy President

- Babu Surendra Nath Ray

Secretary to the Council—C. Tindall, C.I.E., I.C.S. (services placed temporarily at the disposal of the Government of India, Legislative Department, 29 April 1921). A. M. Hutchison (offg.).

Assistant Secretary to the Council—K. N. Mazumdar (offg.).

Registrar to the Council—J. W. McKay.

=== C ===
- Carey, Mr. W. L. (Indian Mining Association.)
- Cathcart, Mr. M. (Dacca and Chittagong (European).)
- Chakrabarti, Babu Banku Chandra. (Noshaki (Non-Muhammadan).)
- Chaudhuri, Babu Kishori Mohan. (Rajshahi (Non-Muhammadan).)
- Chaudhuri, Babu Tankanath. (Dinajpur (Non-Muhammadan).)
- Chaudhuri, Khan Bahadur Maulvi Hafiz Rahman. (Bogra (Muhammadan).)
- Chaudhuri, Maulvi Shah Muhammad. (Malda cum Jalpaiguri (Muhammadan).)
- Chaudhuri, Sir Abdurrahman. (24-Parganas Rural North (Non-Muhammadan).)
- Chaudhuri, Sir Ashutosh. (Hugra cum Pabna (Non-Muhammadan).)
- Chaudhuri, the Hon’ble Nawab Syed Wazir Ali Khan Bahadur. (Minister, Muhammadan East (Muhammadan).)
- Cochran, Mr. A. (Bengal Chamber of Commerce.)
- Cohen, Mr. D. J. (Calcutta South Central (Non-Muhammadan).)
- Currie, Mr. W. C. (Bengal Chamber of Commerce.)

=== D ===
- Das, Babu Bishwanath. (Nominated Non-official—Depressed Classes.)
- Das, Mr. S. R. (Calcutta North-West (Non-Muhammadan).)
- Das, Rai Bahadur Ananda Nath. (Nominated Official.)
- Das Gupta, Babu Nibaran Chandra. (Bakarganj North (Non-Muhammadan).)
- De, Babu Faqirchand. (Hooghly cum Howrah Rural (Non-Muhammadan).)
- Dey, Mr. G. G. (Nominated Official.)
- Doss, Mr. G. T. (Nominated Official.)
- Doss, Rai Bahadur Pyari Lal. (Dacca City (Non-Muhammadan).)
- Dutt, Mr. Ajay Chandra. (Bakarganj East (Non-Muhammadan).)
- Dutt, Mr. Sachindra Prasad. (Calcutta North Central (Non-Muhammadan).)
- Dutta, Babu Ananda Charan. (Chittagong (Non-Muhammadan).)
- Dutta, Babu Indu Bhushan. (Tippera (Non-Muhammadan).)

=== F ===
- Fazooq, Mr. K. G. M. (Tippera (Muhammadan).)
- Forrester, Mr. J. Campbell. (Presidency and Burdwan (European).)
- French, Mr. F. C. (Nominated Official.)

=== G ===
- Ghatak, Rai Sahib Nilmani. (Malda (Non-Muhammadan).)
- Ghose, Mr. D. C. (24-Parganas Rural South (Non-Muhammadan).)
- Ghose, Rai Bahadur Jogendra Chunder. (Calcutta University.)
- Gordon, Mr. A. D. (Indian Tea Association.)
- Gupta, Mr. N. B. (Nominated Official.)

=== H ===
- Haq, Maulvi A. K. Fazl-ul (Khulna (Muhammadan).)
- Haq, Shah Syed Emdadul. (Tippera (Muhammadan).)
- Hopkins, Mr. W. S. (Nominated Official.)
- Huq, Maulvi Ekramul. (Murshidabad (Muhammadan).)
- Hussain, Maulvi Md. Madassur (Burdwan Division North (Muhammadan).)

=== J ===
- James, Mr. R. H. I. Langford. (Indian Jute Mills Association.)
- Janah, Babu Sarat Chandra. (Midnapore South (Non-Muhammadan).)

=== K ===
- Karim, Maulvi Abdul. (Faridpur North (Muhammadan).)
- Karim, Maulvi Fazlal. (Bakarganj South (Muhammadan).)
- Kerr, the Hon’ble Mr. J. H. (Member, Executive Council.)
- Khan, Babu Debendra Lal. (Midnapore North (Non-Muhammadan).)
- Khan, Maulvi Hamid-ud-din. (Rangpur East (Muhammadan).)
- Khan, Maulvi Md. Rafique Uddin. (Mymensingh East (Muhammadan).)
- Khan, Mr. Razaur Rahman. (Calcutta North (Muhammadan).)
- Khan Chaudhuri, Khan Bahadur Maulvi Md. Ershad Ali. (Rajshahi North (Muhammadan).)

=== L ===
- Lang, Mr. J. (Nominated Official.)
- Larmour, Mr. F. A. (Calcutta Trades Association.)
- Law, Raja Reshee Case. (Bengal National Chamber of Commerce.)

=== M ===
- Maharajadhiraja Bahadur of Burdwan, the Hon’ble. (Member, Executive Council.)
- Makramali, Munshi. (Noakhali (Muhammadan).)
- Marr, Mr. A. (Nominated Official.)
- McKenzie, Mr. D. P. (Indian Jute Mills Association.)
- Mitra, Rai Bahadur Mahendra Chandra. [Hooghly Municipal (Non-Muhammadan).]
- Mitter, the Hon'ble Mr. Provash Chunder. (Minister, Presidency Landholders.)
- Moitra, Dr. Jatindra Nath. [Faridpur North (Non-Muhammadan).]
- Morgan, Mr. G. (Bengal Chamber of Commerce.)
- Mukharji, Babu Satish Chandra [Hooghly cum Howrah Rural (Non-Muhammadan).]
- Mukherjee, Babu Nitya Dhon. [Howrah Municipalities (Non-Muhammadan.)]
- Mukherji, Professor S. C. (Nominated Non-Official—The Indian Christian Community.)
- Mukhopadhaya, Babu Sarat Chandra. [Midnapore South (Non-Muhammadan.)]
- Mullick, Babu Nirode Behary. [Bakarganj South (Non-Muhammadan.)]
- Mullick, Babu Surendra Nath. [Calcutta South (Non-Muhammadan).]

=== N ===
- Nukey, Mirza Muhammad Ali. [24-Parganas Municipal South (Muhammadan).]
- Nasker, Babu Hem Chandra. [24-Parganas Rural Central (Non-Muhammadan).]

=== P ===
- Pahlowan, Maulvi Md. Abdul Jubbar [Mymensingh West (Muhammadan).]
- Pal, Rai Bahadur Radha Charan. [Calcutta East (Non-Muhammadan).]
- Payne, Mr. C. F. (Nominated Official.)
- Poddar, Babu Keshoram. (Bengal Marwari Association.)
- Pugh, Colonel A. J. [Presidency and Burdwan (European).]

=== R ===
- Rae, Mr. W. R. [Presidency and Burdwan (European).]
- Raheem, Mr. Abdur. (Nominated Non-Official.)
- Rahim, the Hon'ble Sir Abdur. (Member, Executive Council.)
- Raikat, Mr. Prasanna Deb [Jalpaiguri (Non-Muhammadan).]
- Rauf, Maulvi Shah Abdur [Rangpur West (Muhammadan).]
- Ray, Babu Bhabendra Chandra. [Jessore North (Non-Muhammadan).]
- Ray, Babu Surendra Nath. [Deputy President, 24-Parganas Municipal South (Non-Muhammadan).]
- Ray, Kumar Shib Shekhareswar. (Rajshahi Landholders.)
- Ray, Rai Bahadur Upendra Lal. (Chittagong Landholders.)
- Ray Chaudhuri, Babu Brojendra Kishor (Dacca Landholders.)
- Ray Chaudhuri, Mr. Krishna Chandra. (Nominated Non-Official Labouring Classes.)
- Ray Choudhury, Raja Manmatha Nath. [Mymensingh West (Non-Muhammadan).]
- Roy, Babu Bijoy Prasad Singh [Burdwan (Non-Muhammadan).]
- Roy, Babu Jogendra Krishna. [Faridpur South (Non-Muhammadan).]
- Roy, Babu Jogendra Nath. [Dacca Rural (Non-Muhammadan).]
- Roy, Babu Nalini Nath. [Jessore South (Non-Muhammadan).]
- Roy, Maharaja Bahadur Kshaunish Chandra. [Nadia (Non-Muhammadan).]
- Roy, Mr. J. E. (Bengal Chamber of Commerce.)
- Roy, Mr. Tarit Bhusan. (Bengal Mahajan Sabha.)
- Roy, Rai Bahadur Lalit Mohan Singh. (Burdwan Landholders.)
- Roy, Raja Maniloll Singh. [Burdwan (Non-Muhammadan).]
- Roy Chaudhuri, Babu Sailaja Nath. [Khulna (Non-Muhammadan).]

=== S ===
- Salam, Khan Bahadur Abdus. [Jessore North (Muhammadan).]
- Sarkar, Babu Jogesh Chandra. [Rangpur (Non-Muhammadan).]
- Sarkar, Babu Rishindra Nath. [Bankura West (Non-Muhammadan).]
- Sinha, Babu Surendra Narayan. [Murshidabad (Non-Muhammadan).]
- Stark, Mr. H. A. (Anglo-Indian.)
- Suhrawardy, Dr. A. [Dacca West Rural (Muhammadan).]
- Suhrawardy, Dr. Hassan [Hooghly cum Howrah Municipal (Muhammadan).]
- Suhrawardy, Mr. H. S. [Burdwan Division South (Muhammadan).]
- Swan, Mr. J. A. L. (Nominated Official.)

=== T ===
- Travers, Mr. W. L. [Rajshahi (European).]

=== W ===
- Watson-Smyth, Mr. R. M. (Bengal Chamber of Commerce.)
- Wheeler, the Hon'ble Sir Henry. (Member, Executive Council.)
- Wordsworth, Mr. W. C. (Nominated Official.)
