= Islampur Upazila =

Sparsely populated upazila of Jamalpur District, Bangladesh

Islampur ইসলামপুর
- Upazila
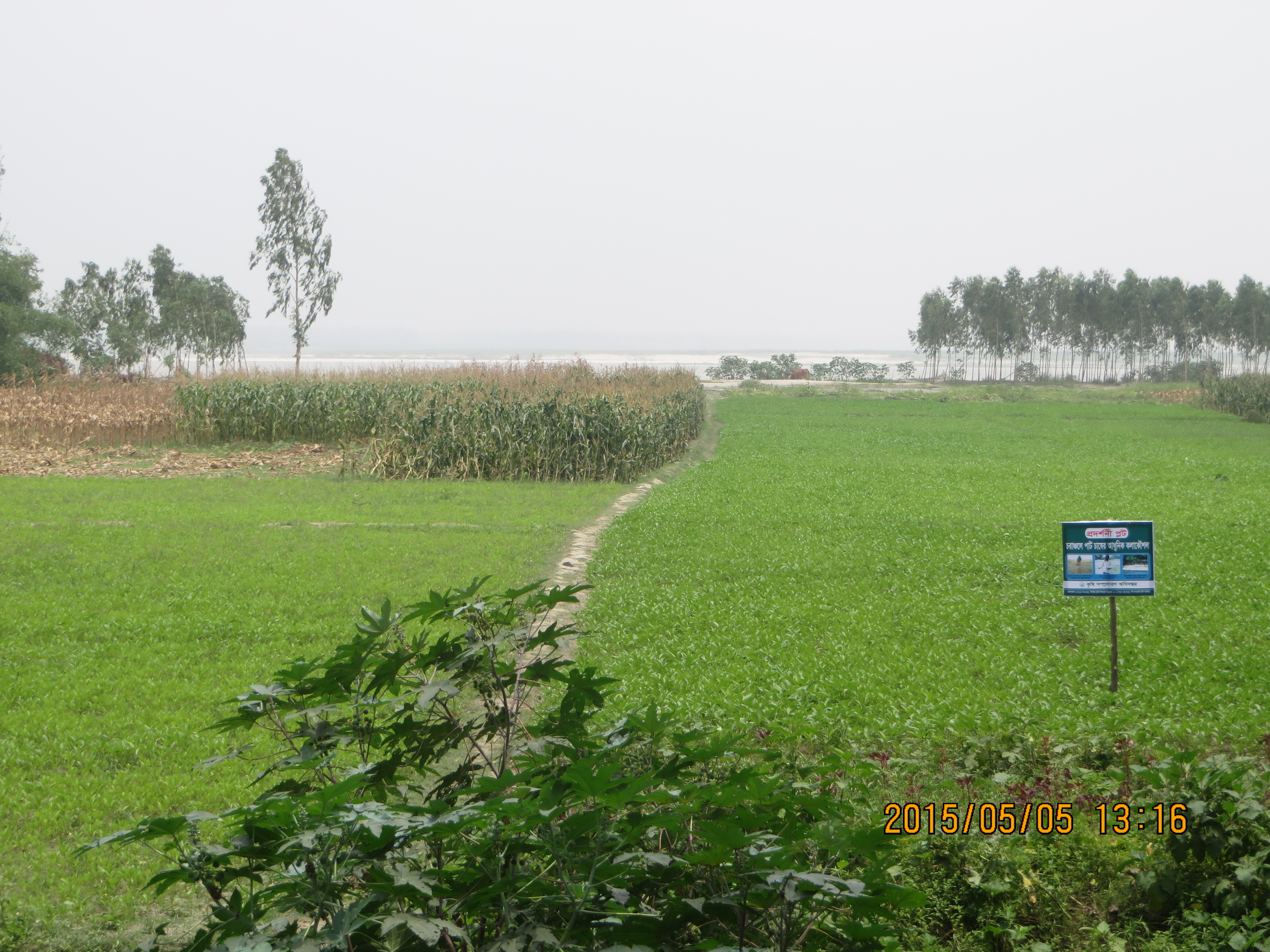
- Jute field in the chars of Islampur upazila

- Coordinates: 25°5′N 89°47.5′E
- Country: Bangladesh
- Division: Mymensingh Division
- District: Jamalpur District
- Headquarters: Islampur

Area
  - Total: 353.31 km^{2} (136.41 sq mi)

Population (2022)
  - Total: 319,758
  - Density: 905.04/km^{2} (2,344.0/sq mi)
- Demonym: Islampuri
- Time zone: UTC+6 (BST)
- Postal code: 2020
- Area code: 0981
- Website: islampur.jamalpur.gov.bd(in Bengali)

Islampur Upazila mauza geocode map

Islampur (Bengali: ইসলামপুর) is the most sparsely populated upazila of Jamalpur District, it is located in Mymensingh Division, Bangladesh.

== Geography ==
Islampur is located at 25.0833°N 89.7917°E. It lies between the Brahmaputra and Jamuna rivers. Islampur has 74,963 households and total area 353.31 km^{2}.

== History ==
Islampur was historically part of the Patiladaha pargana. A Sufi saint by the name of Islam Shah was said to have spread Islam to this area, and the area was visited by the Mughal governor of Bengal Islam Khan Chishti in the 17th century. Eventually, a mouza by the name of Islampur was established here, and after that, a bazaar known as Islampur Bazar was established. The dargahs of Shah Kamal in Durmut Union and Ita Pir are still preserved to this day. In 1831, the Nurul Huda Alim Madrasa was founded in Dengargarh, Islampur which was a leading institution facilitating the education of Islampuris. During the English period, a cutchery was built south of the Sadar road and west of the present Islampur Government College which was used for government purposes. This upazila is associated with the history of indigo cultivation and the atrocities of the indigo lords during the English period. In 1914, a thana was established in Islampur. Palbandha Union is one and a half miles away from the upazila headquarters. The tyrannical Nilkar Sahibs forced the cultivators to cultivate indigo in the 266 acres of land of this union and surrounding vast farmlands. This area had the most indigo cultivation in the entire region of Greater Mymensingh. Remains of indigo kilns and traces of indigo preparation tools still exist to this day.

On 27 April 1971, the Pakistan Army entered Islampur and killed 30 pro-independence fighters. It was captured by pro-independence fighters on 7 December. On 3 November 1983, the status of Islampur Thana was upgraded to upazila (sub-district) as part of the President of Bangladesh Hussain Muhammad Ershad's decentralisation programme. Islampur Municipality was founded in 1998, and it was upgraded from C-class to B-class in 2011.

== Demographics ==
Historical population
Year	Pop.	±%
1981	219,357	—
1991	268,352	+22.3%
2001	289,337	+7.8%
2011	298,429	+3.1%
2022	319,758	+7.1%
Source: Bangladesh Bureau of Statistics

Religions in Islampur Upazila (2022)
Religion	Percent
Islam	98.69%
Hinduism	1.30%
Other or not stated	0.01%

According to the 2022 Bangladeshi census, Islampur Upazila had 83,735 households and a population of 319,758. 10.28% of the population were under 5 years of age. Islampur had a literacy rate (age 7 and over) of 54.66%: 57.8% for males and 51.53% for females, and a sex ratio of 98.27 males for 100 females. 78,643 (24.59%) lived in urban areas.

== Administration ==
Islampur was formed as a thana in 1914 and was turned into an upazila in 1983.

Islampur Upazila is divided into Islampur Municipality and 12 union councils: Belghacha, Char Gualini, Char Putimari, Chinaduli, Gaibandha, Gualerchar, Islampur, Kulkandi, Noarpara, Palabandha, Partharshi, and Shapdari. The union parishads are subdivided into 58 mauzas and 130 villages.

== Economy ==
The reputation of Islampur's copper and wrought metal industry was spread across the country and abroad. The workers here were skilled in the preparation of various shapes and natures of bronze plates, bowls, glasses, cups, drinking bowls, surmadanis, atardanis, lamps, censers, khat-palanka khuras, pitchers, jugs, bronze bells, knife-sword butts, etc. Apart from this, Islampur's eggplant and sugarcane molasses are famous all over the country.

== Facilities ==
Islampur has four orphanages: Ashraful Uloom Madrasa Orphanage, Dariabad Shishu Sadan Orphanage, Sirajabad Farazipara Orphanage and Mohammadpur Women's Hefzkhana Orphanage.

== Notable people ==
- Abdul Jabbar Palwan (1895–1976), former MLA
- Hasan Hafizur Rahman (1932–1983), author
- Khaled Mosharraf (1937–1975), former Chief of Army Staff
- ABM Abdullah (born 1954), personal physician of the Prime Minister
- Rashed Mosharraf (died 2011), former Land Minister and president of Krishak League
- Faridul Haq Khan (born 1956), former Minister of Religious Affairs
- Ashraf Ud-Doullah Pahloan (died 2002), former Member of Parliament
- A. S. Mohammad Abdul Halim, former Cabinet Secretary
- Sultan Mahmud Babu, former Member of Parliament

== See also ==
- Upazilas of Bangladesh
- Districts of Bangladesh
- Divisions of Bangladesh
- Administrative geography of Bangladesh
