= Baksiganj Upazila =

Bakshiganj বকশীগঞ্জ
- Upazila
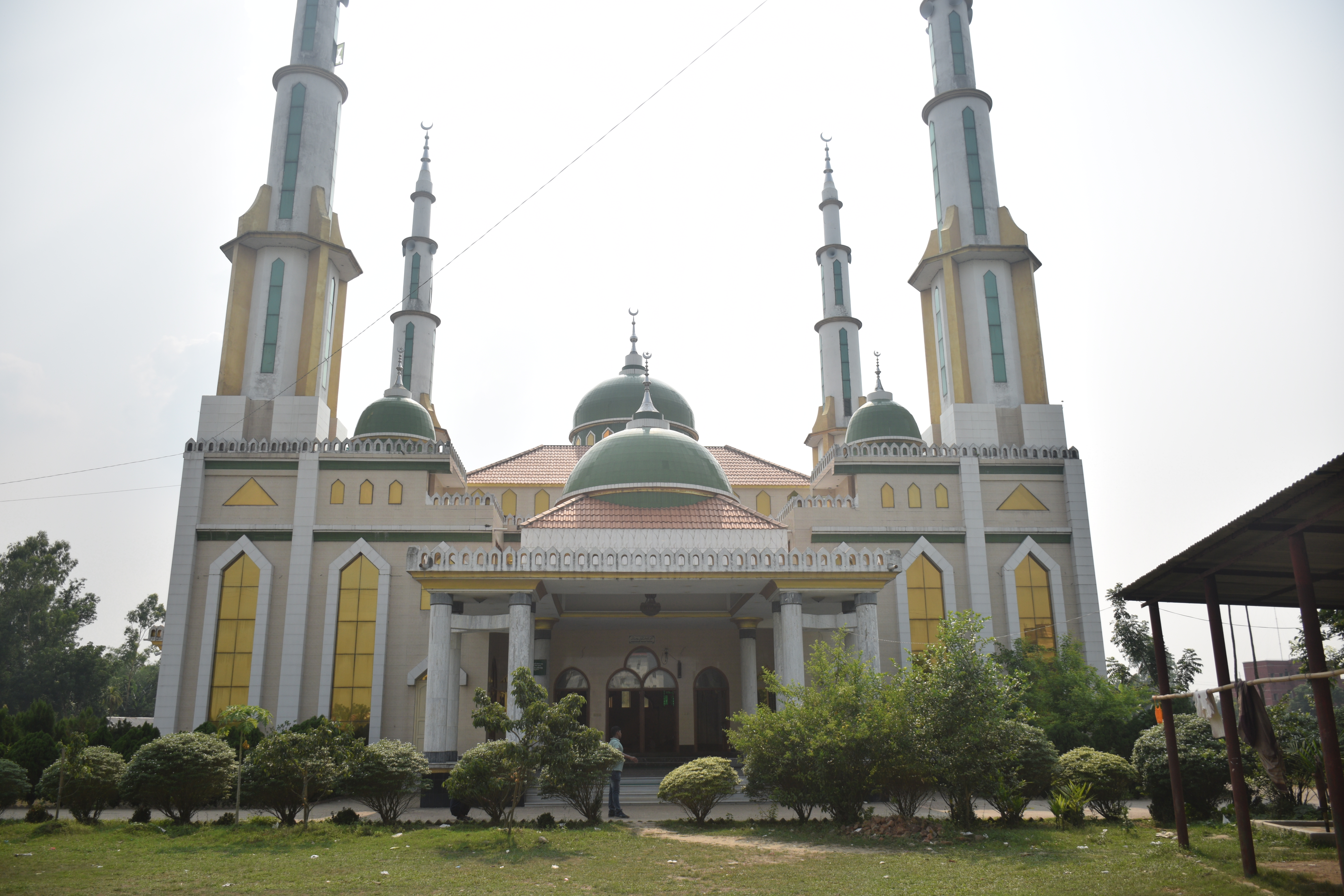
- Masjid-e-Noor in Bakshiganj town

- Coordinates: 25°13.5′N 89°52.5′E
- Country: Bangladesh
- Division: Mymensingh Division
- District: Jamalpur District

Area
  - Total: 238.39 km^{2} (92.04 sq mi)

Population (2022)
  - Total: 239,857
  - Density: 1,006.2/km^{2} (2,605.9/sq mi)
- Time zone: UTC+6 (BST)
- Postal code: 2140
- Website: bokshiganj.jamalpur.gov.bd

Bakshiganj Upazila mauza geocode map

Bakshiganj (Bengali: বকশীগঞ্জ) is an upazila of Jamalpur District in Mymensingh Division, Bangladesh.

Bakshiganj Thana was converted into an upazila in 1983 under the then CMLA Hussain Muhammad Ershad's decentralization programme.

The area of the Bakshigonj Upazila is 238.39 km^{2}. It has a population of 65,568; male 50.97%, female 49.03%; population density is 2820 per km^{2}. Literacy rate among the upazila people is 39.9%.

== History ==
Bakshiganj Thana was established in 1982 and was converted into an upazila in 1983.

During the Bangladesh War of Separation, the Mukti Bahini attacked the Pakistan Army camp at Kamalpur several times. Colonel Abu Taher lost his left leg on 14 November 1971, in one of those attacks.

== Geography ==
Bakshigonj is located at 25.2250°N 89.8750°E . It has 52,222 households and a total area of 238.39 km^{2}. The upazila is bounded by Meghalaya state of India on the north, Islampur upazila on the south, Sherpur district on the east, and Dewanganj upazila on the west. The Garo Hills are on the north east part of the upazila.

== Demographics ==
Historical population
Year	Pop. (000)	±%
1991	157,403	—
2001	178,436	+13.4%
2011	218,930	+22.7%
2022	239,857	+9.6%
Source: Bangladesh Bureau of Statistics

Religions in Baksiganj Upazila (2022)
Religion	Percent
Islam	98.65%
Hinduism	1.08%
Other or not stated	0.27%

According to the 2022 Bangladeshi census, Bakshiganj Upazila had 62,687 households and a population of 239,857. 10.84% of the population were under 5 years of age. Bakshiganj had a literacy rate (age 7 and over) of 61.26%: 63.43% for males and 59.25% for females, and a sex ratio of 94.00 males for 100 females. 109,076 (45.48%) lived in urban areas.

== Administration ==
Baksiganj Upazila is divided into Baksiganj Municipality and seven union parishads: Bagarchar, Bakshiganj, Battajore, Danua, Merurchar, Nilakhia, and Shadhurpara. The union parishads are subdivided into 25 mauzas and 199 villages.

== Economy ==
Economy of Bakshiganj Upazila is a major agricultural, but business and human resources are one of the key pillars of the economy of this area.

== Notable newspapers/news platforms ==
- Seba Hot News
- Daily Urmi Bangla
- Daily Gonojoy
- Saptahik Bakshiganj

== See also ==
- Upazilas of Bangladesh
- Districts of Bangladesh
- Divisions of Bangladesh
- Administrative geography of Bangladesh
