= Jamalpur District =

Jamalpur District জামালপুর জেলা
- District of Bangladesh
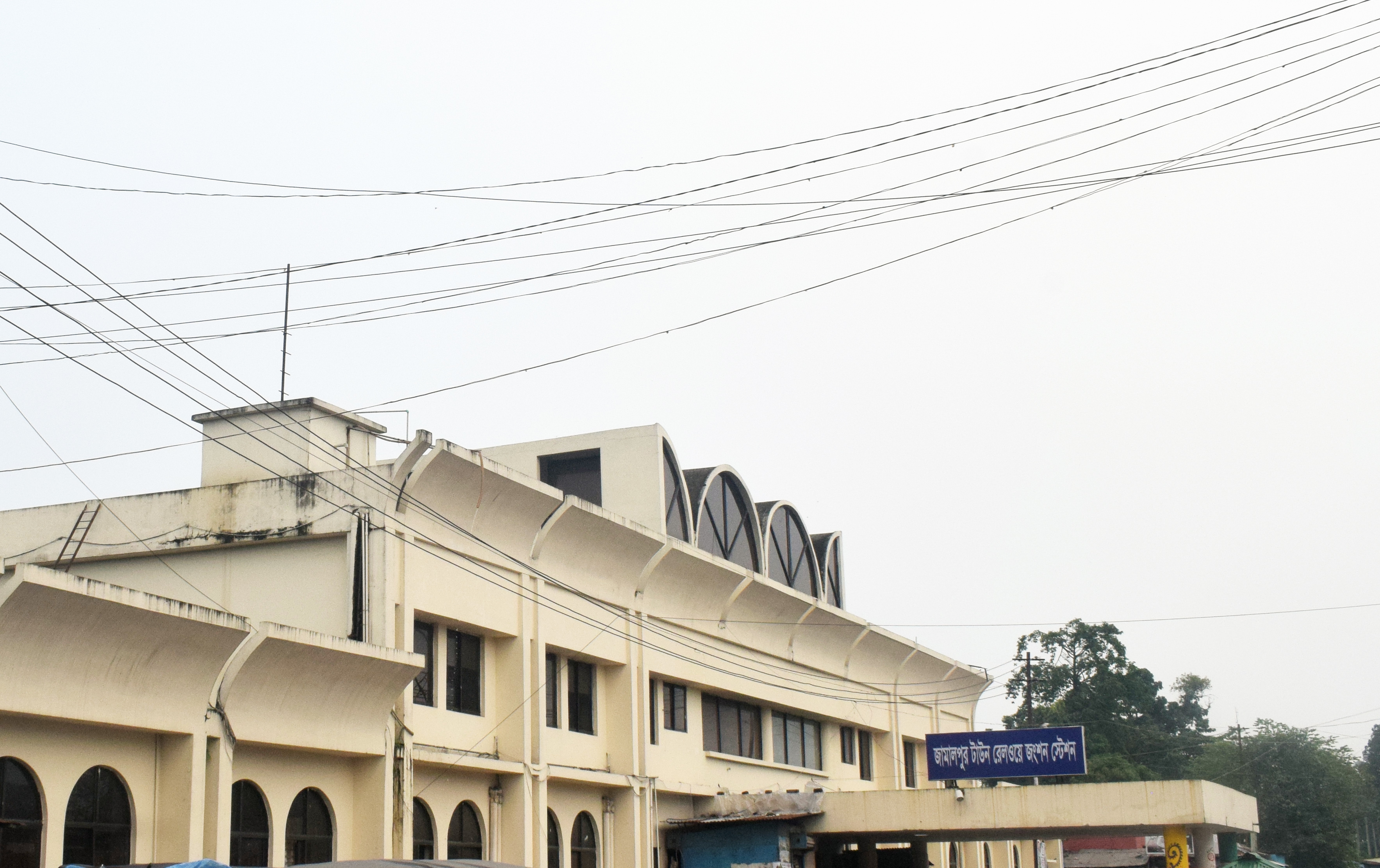
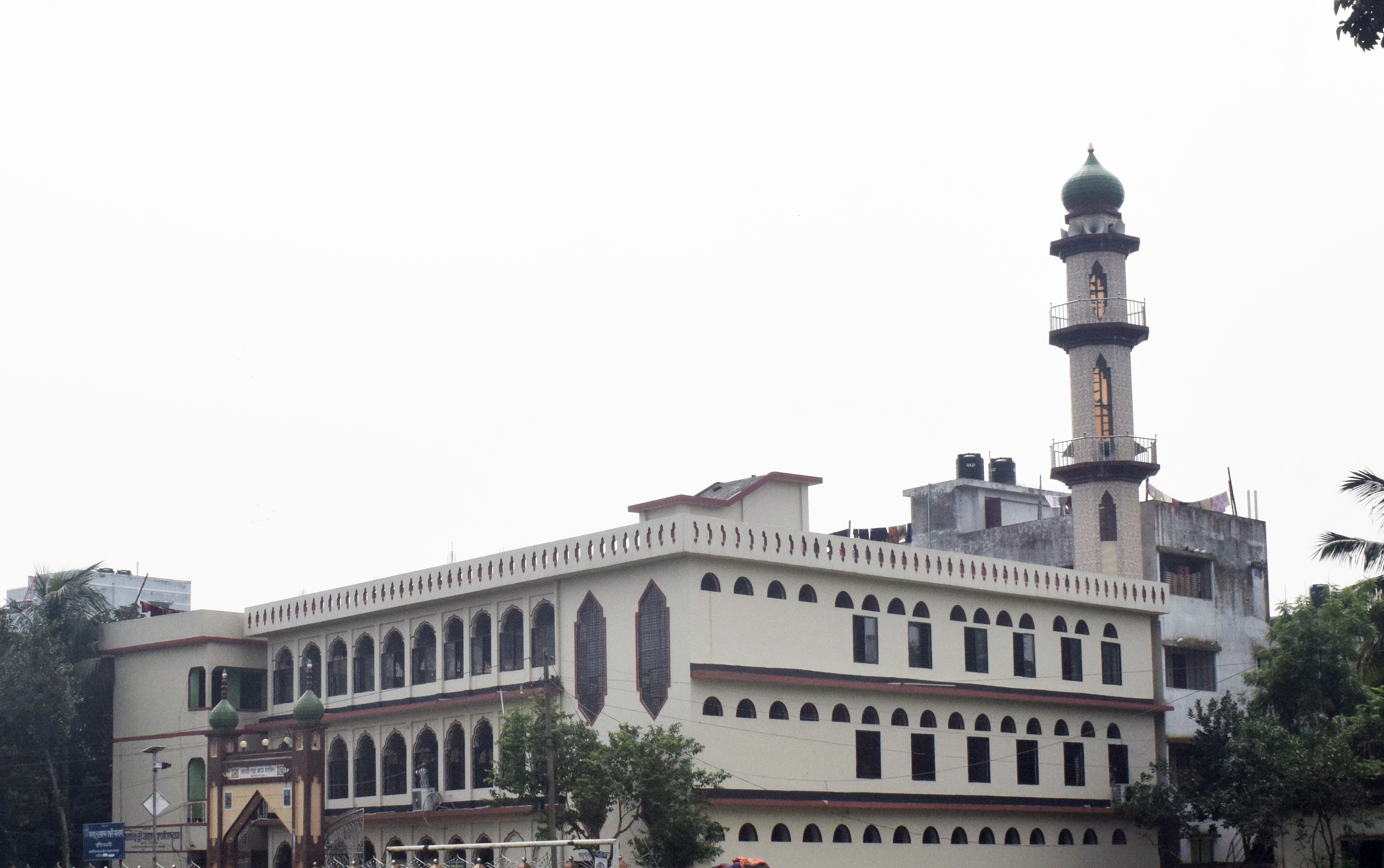
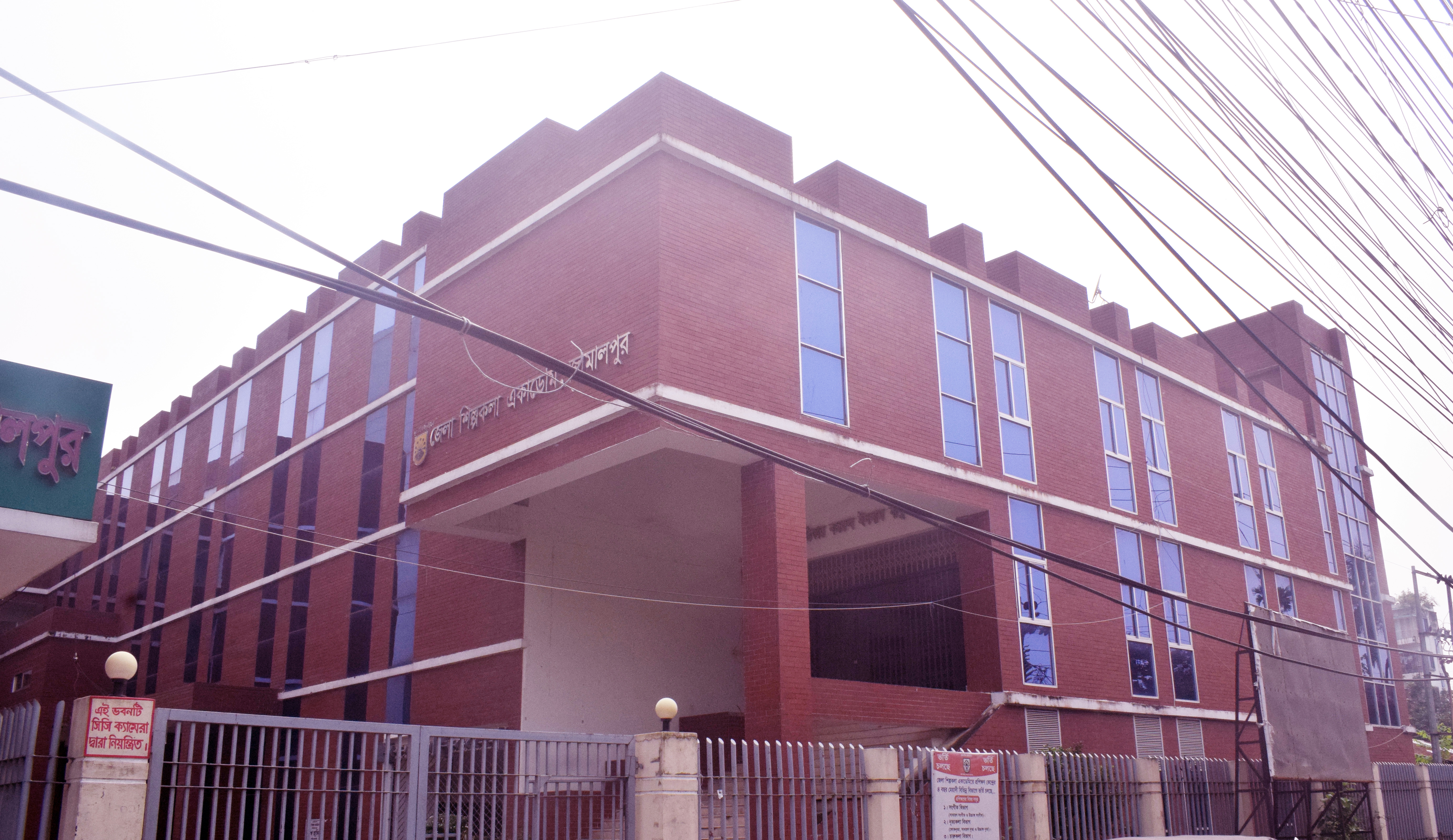
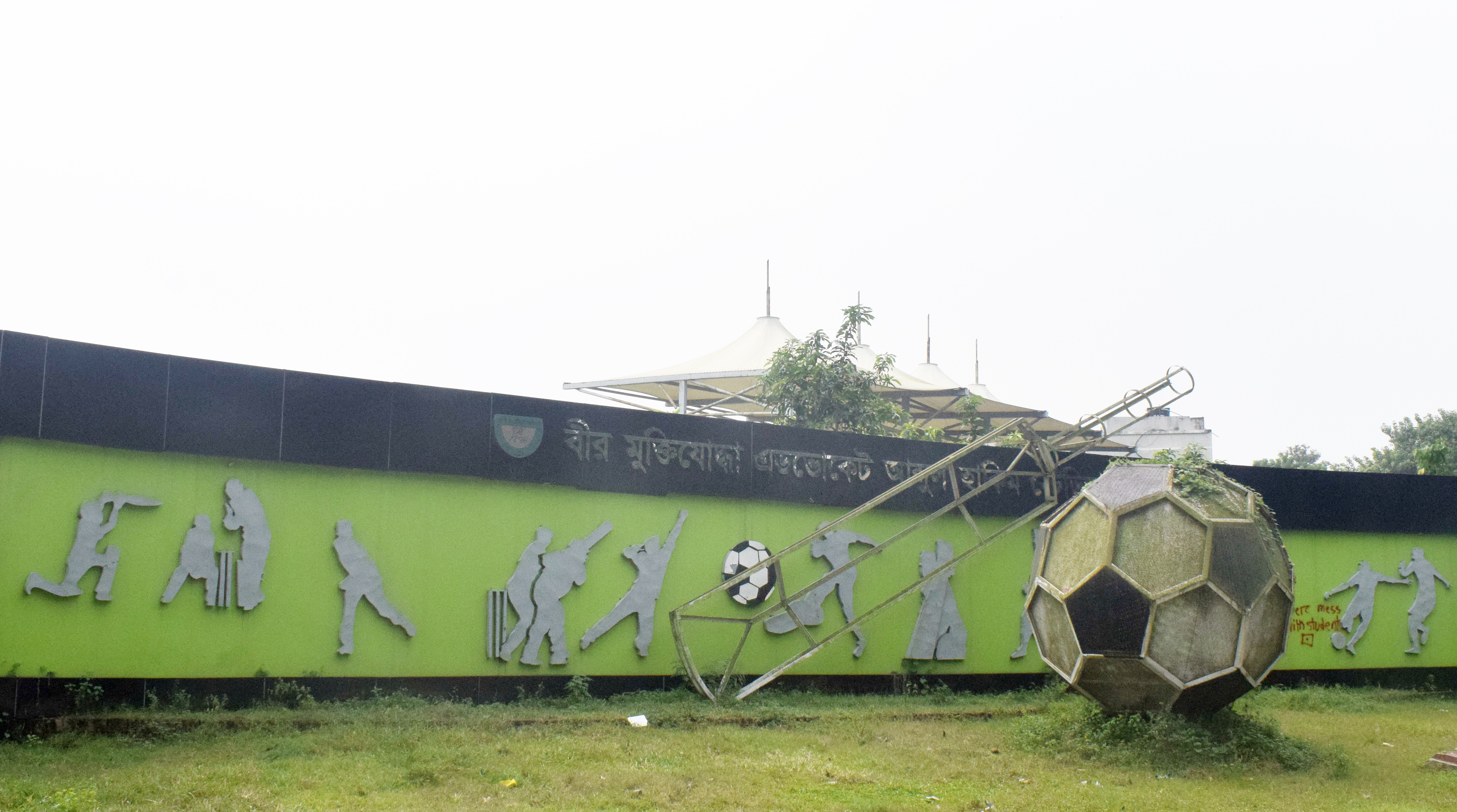
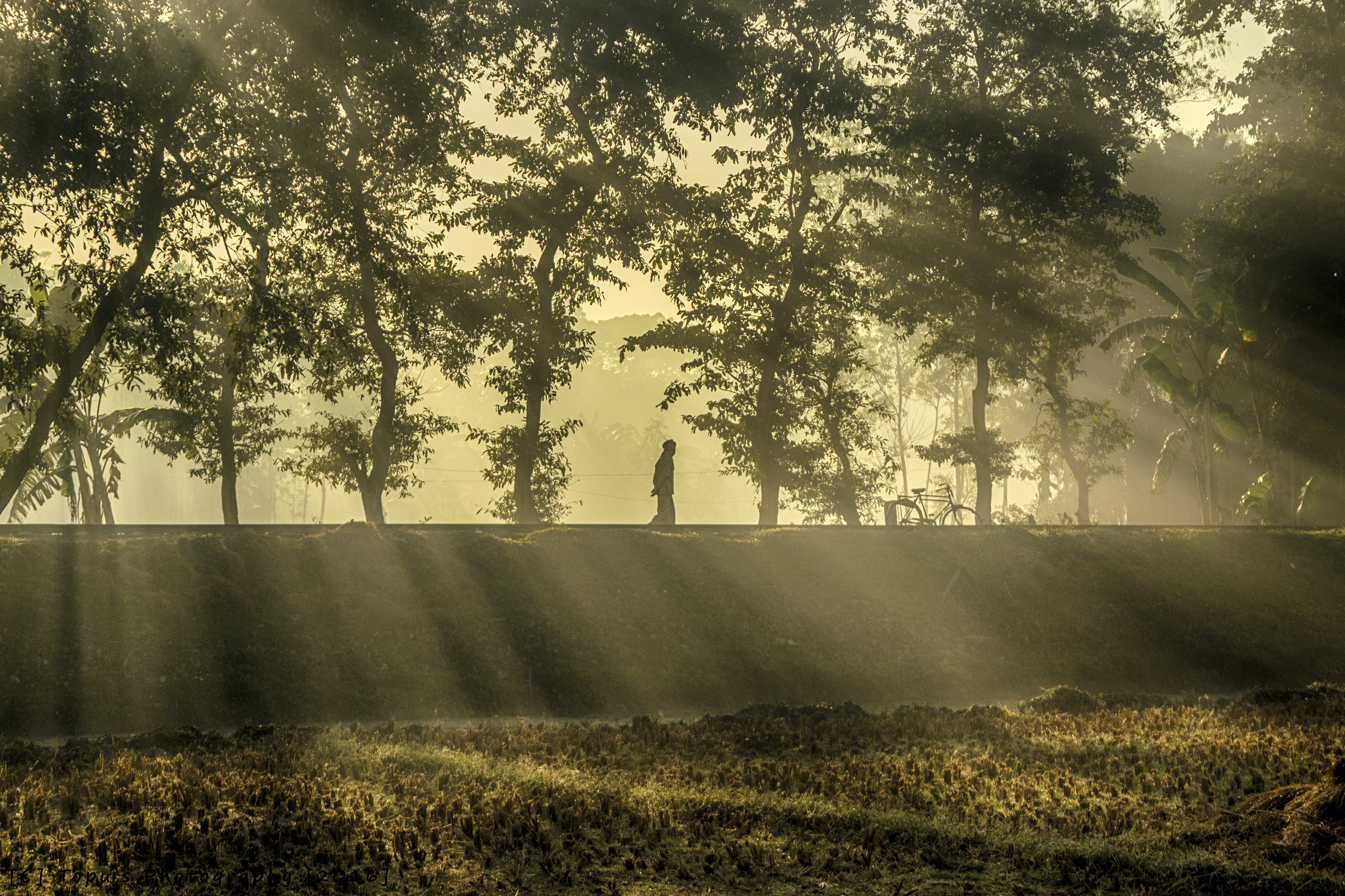
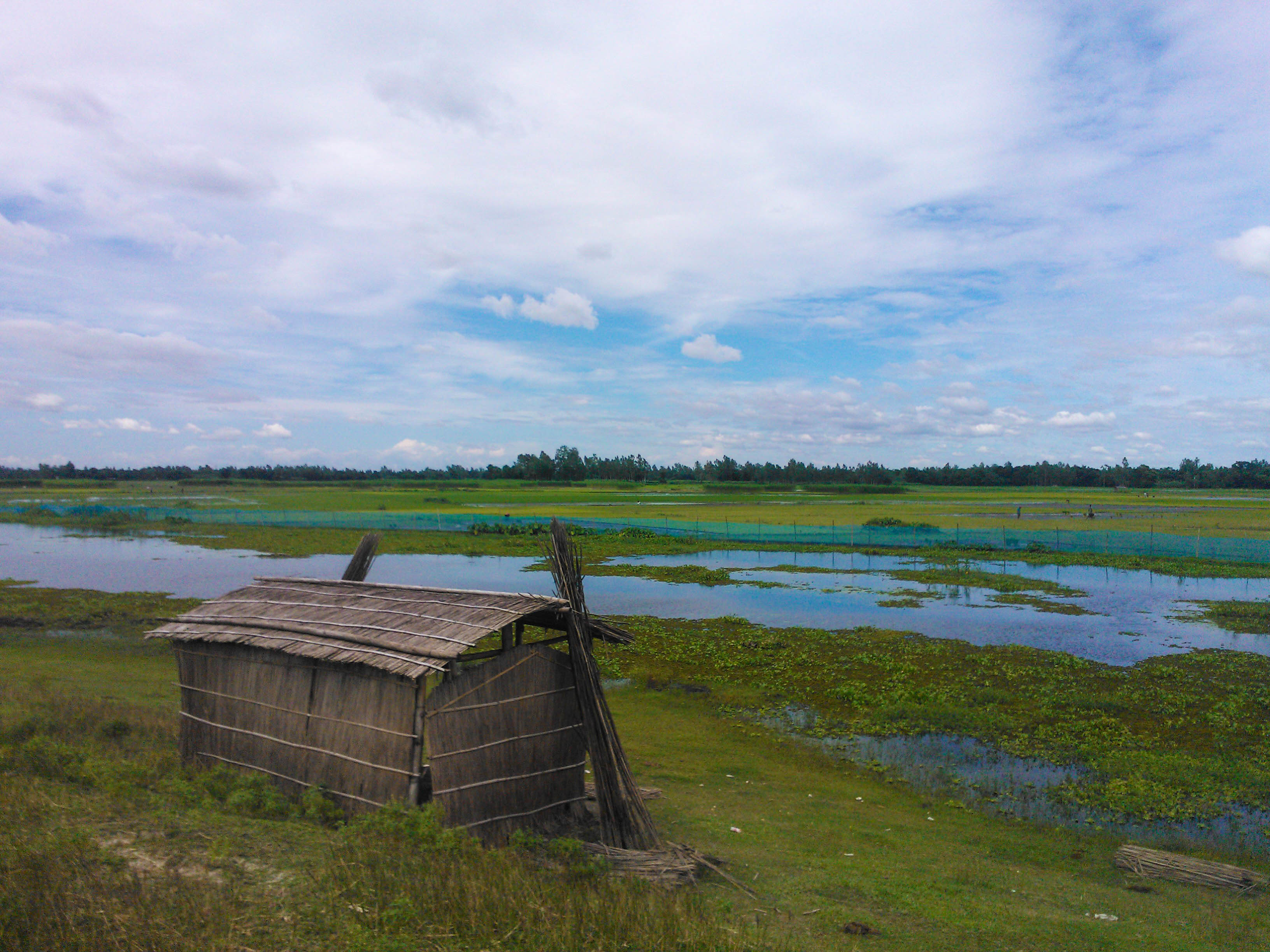
- from top left-right: Jamalpur town railway junction, Masjid in Jamalpur, Zila Shilpokala Academy, Jamalpur stadium, villages in Sarishabari Upazila
- Nickname: Shinghojani
- Location of Jamalpur District in Bangladesh
- Interactive map of Jamalpur District
- Coordinates: 24.92°N 89.96°E
- Country: Bangladesh
- Division: Mymensingh
- Established: 1978
- Headquarters: Jamalpur

Government
  - Deputy Commissioner: Muhammad Yousuf Ali (BNP)

Area
  - District of Bangladesh: 2,115.16 km^{2} (816.67 sq mi)
  - Metro: 0 km^{2} (0 sq mi)
- Elevation: 17 m (56 ft)

Population (2022)
  - District of Bangladesh: 2,499,738
  - Rank: 33
  - Density: 1,182/km^{2} (3,060/sq mi)
- Demonym: Jamalpuri
- Time zone: UTC+06:00 (BST)
- Postal code: 2000
- Area code: 0981
- ISO 3166 code: BD-21
- HDI (2018): 0.574 medium · 18th of 21

Jamalpur District (Bengali: জামালপুর জেলা) is a district in Bangladesh, and part of Mymensingh Division. It was established in 1978 during the rule of Ziaur Rahman. It has its headquarters in Jamalpur.

== Etymology ==
The district is named for its headquarters, Jamalpur. Jamalpur is named similarly to Shah Jamal, a Sufi saint from Yemen who came to spread Islam in the region during the reign of Akbar. The previous name was Shinghojani.

== History ==
The district was previously known as Shinghajani. The most notable historical events include the Sannyasi rebellion (1772–1790), the Indigo revolt (1859), famine (1874), the advent of rail transport (1899), and the Bangladesh Liberation War in 1971.

The district used to be very famous and important in the past for its Bahadurabad ferry ghat. Ferries with trains used to cross the Jamuna River, going between Bahadurabad, Jamalpur and Tistamukh Ghat, Gaibandha. The rail-ferry System closed after the construction of Jamuna Bridge finished.

=== War of Liberation ===
On June 21, 1971, the Pakistan army, in collaboration with local Razakars, killed 9 people at the Shashan Ghat (cremation center) at Jamalpur Sadar Upazila on the bank of the Brahmaputra. pro-separation Bengali fighters and the Pakistani army on July 31 fought at Kamalpur, Pakistani Army Base of Bakshiganj Upazila, with heavy losses to the Pakistan army. In this battle, numerous fighters including Capt. Salauddin Mumtaz, Ahaduzzaman, Abul Kalam Azad were killed. A battle was fought between Bengali troops under Sector Commander Colonel Abu Taher and the Pakistani army on November 13 at Kamalpur of Bakshiganj Upazila. Taher was seriously wounded.

The small Pakistani military base at Kamalpur fell on December 4, following a heavy attack by rebels lasting 21 days. In this battle, 220 Pakistani soldiers under the command of Captain Ahsan Malik surrendered.

The Jamalpur garrison was commanded by Sultan Ahmed. He earned renown among the Pakistanis when he refused to surrender to the Indian commander, Hardev Kler, telling him to use a sten, not a pen. This front, together with the Rangpur-Bogra front further west, was the only front where Pakistani troops held out during the war. However, on December 10, 1971, they were ordered to withdraw to Dhaka. During this retreat, their commander Abdul-Qadir Niazi fell into enemy custody, giving the pro-independence Bengali militants and Indians a morale boost.

== Geography ==
Spanning an area of 2115.16 km^{2}, Jamalpur is located between 24°34' and 25°26' north and between 89°40' and 90°12' east. It shares an international border with the Indian state of Meghalaya in the north east. It is surrounded by Kurigram and Sherpur districts in the north, Tangail district in the south, Mymensingh and Sherpur districts in the east, Jamuna River, Bogura, Sirajganj and Gaibandha districts in the west. The main town is situated on the bank of the river Brahmaputra, 140 kilometres (87 mi) north of Dhaka, the national capital.

Main rivers and bodies of water include the Old Brahmaputra, Banar River, Kaiser Beel Kaludaga Lake, Bamonji Beel, Chatal Beel, Roumari Beel etc. The Old Brahmaputra begins in the district as a distributary of the Jamuna. It flows south and then east through the district, passing through the town of Jamalpur. The Jamuna forms the western border of the district, and many of the chars are included in the region.

Small hills once existed in the south-west of the district that were part of the Madhupur tract. The hills were covered with Sal forests. Currently, no such forests or hills exist as they were destroyed due to population growth. Today, there are people living where the small hills once stood. There are some hills and forests still remaining in the north of the district by the border with the Indian State of Meghalaya and it is one of the only places in north-eastern Bangladesh where elephants are still found.

== Demographics ==
Historical population
Year	Pop.	±% p.a.
1974	1,285,145	—
1981	1,530,830	+2.53%
1991	1,874,440	+2.05%
2001	2,107,229	+1.18%
2011	2,292,674	+0.85%
2022	2,499,738	+0.79%

According to the 2022 Census of Bangladesh, Jamalpur District had 652,047 households and a population of 2,499,738 with an average 3.81 people per household. Among the population, 476,607 (19.06%) inhabitants were under 10 years of age. The population density was 1,182 people per km^{2}. Jamalpur District had a literacy rate (age 7 and over) of 61.70%, compared to the national average of 74.80%, and a sex ratio of 1055 females per 1000 males. Approximately, 26.02% (650,493) of the population lived in urban areas. The ethnic population was 1,222.

Religion in Jamalpur District (2022)
Religion	Percent
Islam	98.36%
Hinduism	1.59%
Others	0.05%

Religion in present-day Jamalpur District
Religion	1941 (Note: 1941 figures are for Jamalpur subdivision of Mymensingh district excluding Sribardi, Sherpur, Nokla and Nalitabari thanas. Thana and district boundaries have shifted slightly since 1941.)		1981		1991		2001		2011		2022	
Religion	Pop.	%	Pop.	%	Pop.	%	Pop.	%	Pop.	%	Pop.	%
Islam	623,904	87.86%	1,494,818	97.65%	1,832,573	97.77%	2,067,685	98.12%	2,252,181	98.23%	2,458,714	98.36%
Hinduism	85,310	12.01%	34,141	2.23%	36,947	1.97%	37,449	1.78%	38,832	1.69%	39,827	1.59%
Others (Note: Including Jainism, Christianity, Buddhism, Zoroastrianism, Judaism, Ad-Dharmis, or not stated)	897	0.13%	1,871	0.12%	4,920	0.26%	2,095	0.10%	1,661	0.08%	1,197	0.05%
Total Population	710,111	100%	1,530,830	100%	1,874,440	100%	2,107,229	100%	2,292,674	100%	2,499,738	100%

Jamalpur district has the highest percentage of Muslims relative to the total population of any district in Bangladesh. A majority of Hindus are found in urban areas. There are around 1,000 Christians, mainly Garo, living mainly in Bakshiganj Upazila.

== Economy ==
Jamalpur is an important economic hub in the northern region of Bangladesh. For many years, the district has been famous for agriculture, trade, and small industries. Rice, jute, sugarcane, tobacco, mustard, pulses, peanuts, betel leaf, eggs, leather, and handicrafts are some of the major products of this area. Jute and sugarcane have historically been two of the main cash crops of Jamalpur and have played a major role in the local economy for decades.

The district is also historically connected with the sugar industry. The famous Zeal Bangla Sugar Mills, located in Dewanganj, was established in 1957 with financial and technical support from the then Pakistan government and New Zealand. It is one of the oldest sugar mills in Bangladesh. Even today, the mill continues sugar production by collecting sugarcane from local farmers. In the 2025 crushing season, the mill targeted crushing around 70,000 tonnes of sugarcane to produce nearly 5,000 tonnes of sugar.

Jamalpur has long been known as a center for jute production and trade. Bangladesh itself is one of the world’s leading exporters of jute, contributing around 42% of global jute production in recent years. Jamalpur’s farmers and local markets have traditionally contributed to this sector through raw jute cultivation and jute-based trade.

Another major industrial contributor is Jamuna Fertilizer Company Limited, located in Sarishabari. Established in 1991, it is one of the largest urea fertilizer factories in Bangladesh. The factory has a production capacity of around 1,700 tons of urea fertilizer per day and supplies fertilizer to many northern districts of the country. Thousands of farmers directly benefit from this production. The factory also creates employment opportunities for workers, transport operators, and local businesses.

Jamalpur is now entering a new phase of industrial development through the Jamalpur Economic Zone established by the Bangladesh Economic Zones Authority (BEZA). The economic zone covers around 436 acres of land and was developed with an estimated cost of about Tk 302 crore. The project aims to attract both local and foreign investment, increase exports, and create employment opportunities for local people. According to BEZA, the zone is expected to create around 32,000 direct jobs in the future.

Several major companies are already investing in this economic zone. Fervent Multiboard Industries announced an investment of about $93 million to establish a large factory producing wood and jute-based particle boards, where nearly 1,000 people are expected to work.

In recent years, more companies have joined the economic zone. Rosin Exports Limited is investing nearly $10 million in a modern denim factory that is expected to employ around 800 people. BRIC is also investing about $5.32 million in an agro-processing industry to produce juice, beverages, spices, and processed agricultural products.

Alongside agriculture and heavy industries, Jamalpur is also famous for its traditional handicrafts. Nakshi Kantha, the handmade embroidered quilt, is a proud cultural heritage of the district. Many rural women are involved in this work to support their families financially. Organizations such as Ayesha Abed Foundation help local women through training, employment, and market support. Today, some Nakshi Kantha products from Jamalpur are exported to international markets, contributing to women’s empowerment and the local economy.

Overall, agriculture, cottage industries, fertilizer production, sugar mills, and new industrial investments are transforming Jamalpur into a growing center of trade, industry, and employment in Bangladesh.

== Culture ==
Folk music is popular in the district. Popular songs include "Gunaibibir Gan", "Jari Gan of Khairun", "Palagan of Rupvan", "Panchali", "Ghetu Gan" and "Meyeli geet" (songs sung by women on the occasion of marriage and Gaye Holud festivals). In the rural areas, various games and sports are practiced. These competitions include bullfights, horse racing, Moi (ladder) race, and Lathi Khela (stick game). During the rainy season, boat races are arranged in the Jamuna river. The Garo community perform dances at the 'Bigan Gala' festival.

Local culinary specialities include the savoury dish Pithali.

== Administration ==
Jamalpur District upazila geocode map

The district is divided into seven upazilas:

- Dewanganj Upazila
- Baksiganj Upazila
- Islampur Upazila
- Jamalpur Sadar Upazila
- Madarganj Upazila
- Melandaha Upazila
- Sarishabari Upazila

== Transport ==
The district is connected by road, rail, and river with Dhaka and the rest of the country. It has a railway station and three dak bungalows.

== See also ==
- Districts of Bangladesh
- History of Mymensingh
- Upazilas of Bangladesh
- Divisions of Bangladesh
- Jamalpur Rural Development Academy
- Upazila
- Thana
