= Murad Hasan =

Bangladeshi politician

- মুরাদ হাসান
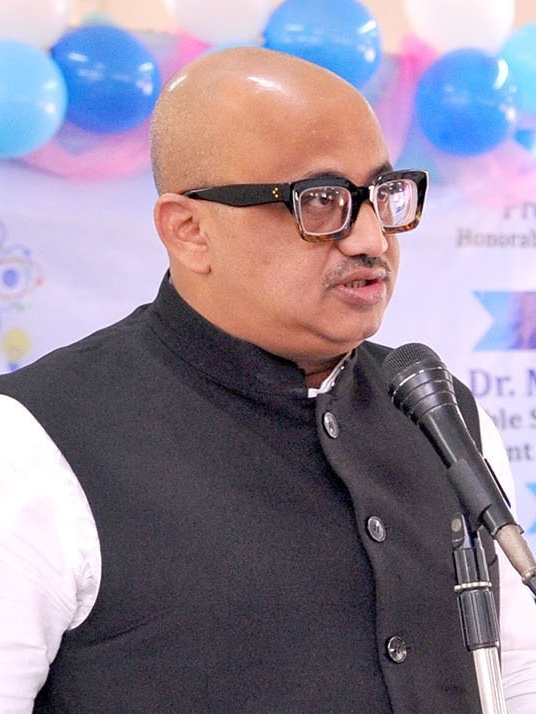
- Hasan in 2020

Minister of State for Information and Broadcasting
- In office 19 May 2019 – 7 December 2021
- Prime Minister: Sheikh Hasina
- Preceded by: Zunaid Ahmed Palak
- Succeeded by: Mohammad A. Arafat

Member of Parliament for Jamalpur-4
- In office 30 January 2019 – 29 January 2024
- Preceded by: Md. Mamunoor Rashid
- Succeeded by: Abdur Rashid
- In office 25 January 2009 – 24 January 2014
- Preceded by: Anwarul Kabir Talukdar

Minister of State for Health and Family Welfare
- In office 7 January 2019 – 19 May 2019
- Preceded by: Zahid Maleque
- Succeeded by: Zahid Maleque

Personal details
- Born: 10 October 1974 (age 51) Jamalpur, Dhaka, Bangladesh
- Party: Awami League
- Education: Jamalpur Zilla School; Notre Dame College; Mymensingh Medical College

Murad Hasan (born 10 October 1974) is a Awami League politician and former Jatiya Sangsad member from Jamalpur-4 constituency and a former State Minister of Information served during 2019–2021.

== Background and education ==
Hasan was born on 10 October 1974 to a Bengali family of Muslim Taluqdars in the village of Daulatpur in Sarishabari, Jamalpur, then part of the Mymensingh district. He is a son of Motiar Rahman Talukdar who was one of the organizers of 1971 Liberation War, the temporary justice of Mujibnagar government and the president of Jamalpur District Awami League and District Lawyers Association.

Hasan passed SSC from Jamalpur Zila School in 1990, HSC from Notre Dame College in 1992 and MBBS from Mymensingh Medical College in 2001.

== Career ==
Hasan was elected to parliament in 2008 from Jamalpur-4 as a Bangladesh Awami League candidate. He took the office of state minister of information on 20 May 2019. He has been the State Minister of Health and Family Welfare Ministry in the 2018 cabinet and served as the State Minister of Information Ministry of the Bangladesh Government. He also performed as a consultant in the Department of Oncology at Bangabandhu Sheikh Mujib Medical University. He is also one of the core members of Swadhinata Chikitshak Parishad.

Following the fall of the Sheikh Hasina led Awami League government, Hasan's home in Jamalpur District was vandalized and burned down in February 2025.

== Controversies and fallout ==
On 13 October 2021, at a press conference Hasan said - "Islam is not the state religion, I do believe it. We will soon take measures to remove Islam as a state religion from the constitution of Bangladesh." Over the remark other political parties and religious groups of Bangladesh got outraged and demanded his termination.

On 2 December 2021, at an online talk-show, Hasan made vulgar, sexual and racist remarks about Tarique Rahman and his daughter Zaima Rahman, on the issue of taking the lead of Bangladesh Nationalist Party (BNP). For the indecent remarks, BNP leaders demanded for Hasan's resignation to the government of Bangladesh.

On 5 December 2021, an audio call record, of Hasan with Bangladeshi actress Mahiya Mahi went viral on social-media, where Hasan was heard making sexual remarks on Mahi's body, asking her to come over to his place and threatening to rape her. For the audio call record netizens started to call him as Murad Takla (lit. A bald person named Murad). Over the call-record scandal and the remarks about Tarique Rahman and his daughter, on 6 December, PM Sheikh Hasina ordered Hasan to resign from his position of State Minister of Information. The next day, on 7 December, he resigned from his position citing personal reasons in the resignation letter submitted to the Prime Minister's office. He left for Canada on early 10 December but he was denied entry by the Canada Border Services Agency. After also getting denied entry to the United Arab Emirates, he returned to Dhaka on 12 December. After the event, Hero Alom published several parody songs about Hasan.

On 26 November 2023, Awami League announced the final list of its 298 candidates to contest the 2024 national election which did not include Hasan.

Since September 2025, the Jamalpur court has issued an arrest warrant against Hasan due to the Tk10,000 crore defamation suit accusing him of making derogatory comments about Zia's family.

== Personal life ==
Hasan is married to Jahanara Ehsan and together they have two children. In January 2022, Jahanara filed a general diary (GD) against him, alleging torture and abuse.
