= Government Ashek Mahmud College =

Educational institution in Bangladesh

Coordinates: 24.9324°N 89.9358°E

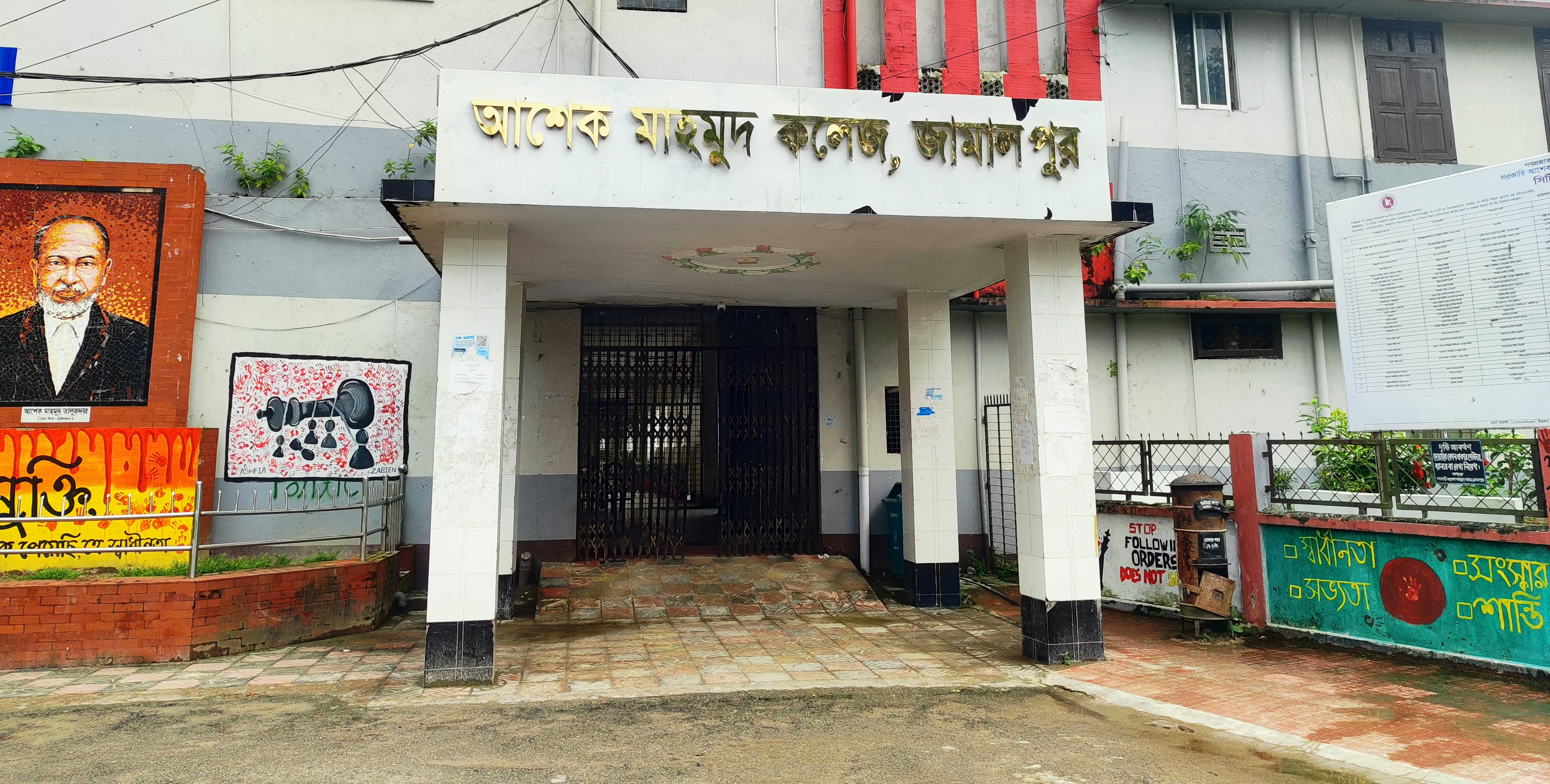
Main gate of Government Ashek Mahmud College

Government Ashek Mahmud College (AMC) is an institution of higher education in Jamalpur District, Bangladesh.

== History ==
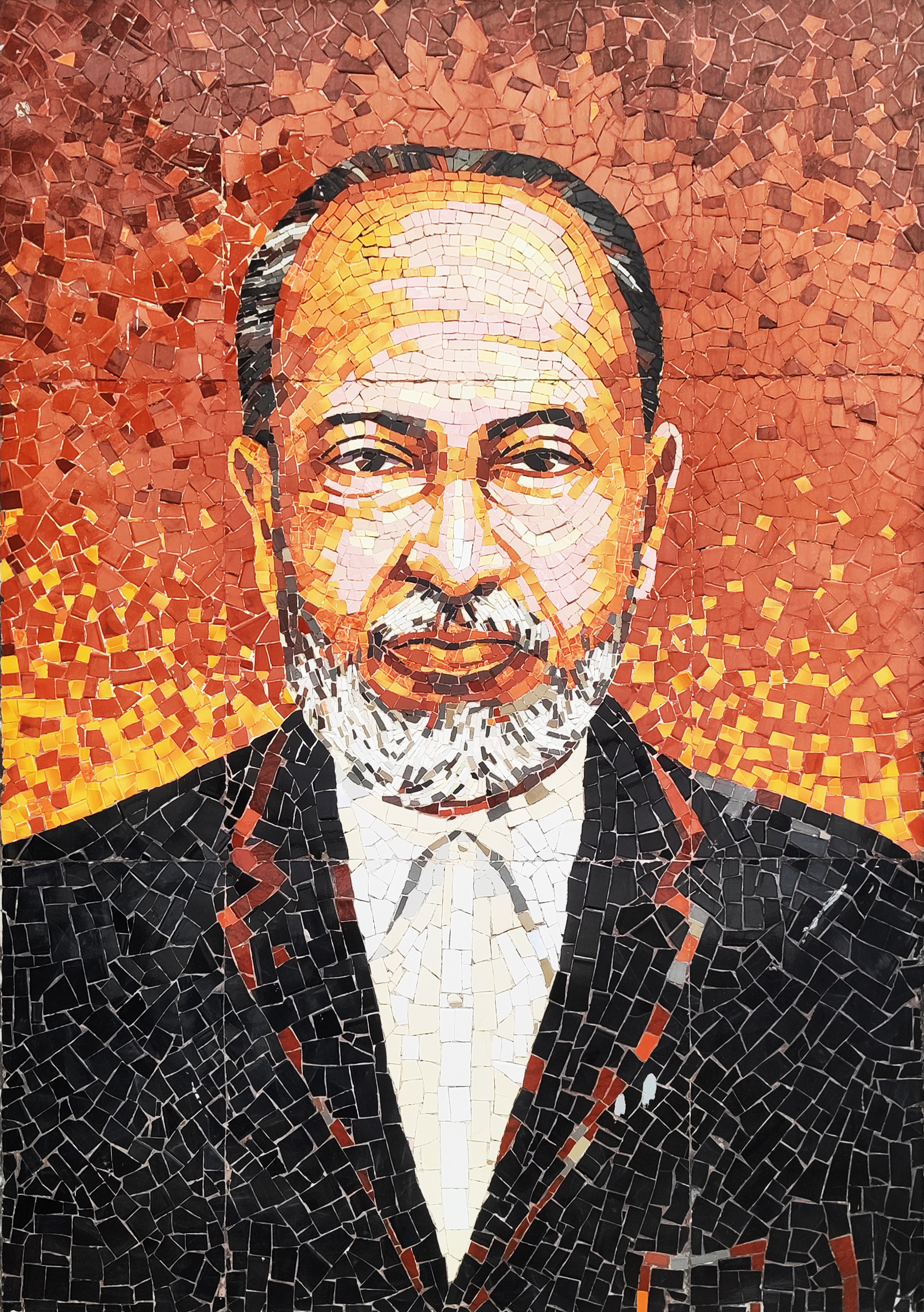
Mosaic portrait of the college's eponymous benefactor, Ashek Mahmud Talukdar

Jamalpur College was established on 10 August 1946. The college started with 160 students. Ashek Mahmud Talukder, a landlord from what is now Madarganj Upazila, made a substantial donation to the college, in recognition of which, in 1947, it was renamed Ashek Mahmud College. The college was initially under the University of Calcutta. After the Partition of India, it came under Dacca University.

The college was nationalized on 7 May 1979, becoming Government Ashek Mahmud College. It became an affiliated college of National University in 1992.

Also in 1992, it introduced its first honors courses, in Bengali and management. Master's degree courses were added in the same two fields in 1995. Three years later, master's courses were added in accounting and political science. Honors courses in economics and mathematics were added in 2001. In 2005, honors courses followed in seven more subjects: biology, chemistry, English, Islamic history, philosophy, political science, and zoology. Two years later, an honors courses in Islamic education was introduced.

In 2011, the college applied to the Ministry of Education for permission to start master's courses in eight additional subjects. National University opposed the plan because the college did not have enough teachers. The college asked the Ministry of Public Administration to create 110 new positions, but only 13 were approved. After further review, the college added seven additional postgraduate courses in 2015.

== Department ==
Science	Arts	Business Studies
Physics	Islamic Study	Accounting
Math	Islamic history	Management
Chemistry	Philosophy	Finance
Botany	Bangla	Statistics
Zoology	English	BBA

== Notable people ==
=== Faculty ===
- Abdus Salam, state minister for agriculture

=== Alumni ===
- Md Abul Kalam Azad, principal secretary to the Prime Minister's Office
- Amjad Hossain, film director
- Ariful Islam, cricketer
- Khondakar Ashraf Hossain, author
- Mirza Azam, state minister for textiles and jute
- Muhammad Kamaruzzaman, politician and journalist
- Nazrul Islam Babu, lyricist, Ekushey Padak recipient
- Rahat Khan, journalist, litterateur, and teacher
- Raqibul Hasan, cricketer
- Rezaul Karim Hira, minister for land

== Gallery ==
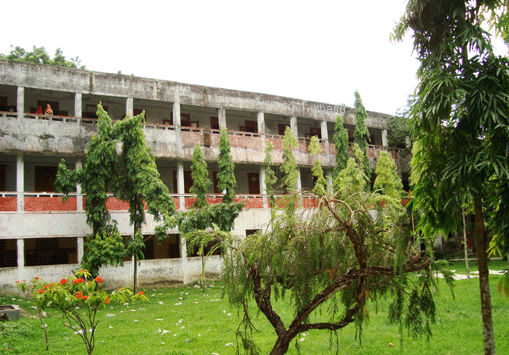
Govt. Ashek Mahmud College
