= Khalilur Rahman (general) =

Bangladeshi officer

Member of Parliament for Jamalpur-5
- In office 10 July 1986 – 6 December 1987
- Preceded by: Syed Abdus Sobhan
- Succeeded by: Mohammad Reza Khan

2nd Director General of Bangladesh Rifles
- In office 22 February 1974 – 31 October 1975
- President: Mohammad Mohammadullah; Sheikh Mujibur Rahman; Khondaker Mostaq Ahmad
- Prime Minister: Sheikh Mujibur Rahman; Muhammad Mansur Ali
- Preceded by: Chitta Ranjan Dutta
- Succeeded by: Quazi Golam Dastgir

Personal details
- Born: 1 January 1927 Jamalpur, Bengal, British India
- Died: 2021 (aged 94) Rawalpindi, Pakistan
- Education: Presidency College; Pakistan Military Academy; Staff College, Camberley

Military service
- Allegiance: Pakistan (Before 1973); Bangladesh
- Branch/service: Pakistan Army; Bangladesh Army; Bangladesh Rifles
- Years of service: 1950–1976
- Rank: Major General
- Unit: East Bengal Regiment
- Commands: Chief of Defence Staff; Director General of Bangladesh Rifles; Sector Commander of EPR; CO of 5th EBR
- Battles/wars: Indo-Pakistani War of 1965; Bangladesh Liberation War (as POW)

Khalilur Rahman was a major general of the Bangladesh Army and former director general of Bangladesh Rifles (now Border Guard Bangladesh) and former chief of defence staff.

== Early life and education ==
Khalilur Rahman was born on 1 January 1927 in Nandina Near Kharkharia Village, Jamalpur, Bengal Presidency, then British India (now in Mymensingh, Bangladesh). He obtained his bachelor's degree in economics from Presidency College, Calcutta. He later joined the Pakistan Military Academy in 1948 and was commissioned in the East Bengal Regiment in 1950. He graduated from Staff College, Camberley.

== Military career ==
=== Pakistan Army ===
He started his career by joining the Pakistan Army in 1948. He was commissioned in the Pakistan Army from the 2nd PMA Long Course on 26 August 1950 and was posted to the East Bengal Regimental Centre. In 1952 he was posted to the 1st East Bengal Regiment, which was in Jessore Cantonment. At the time of his posting in the 1st East Bengal Regiment, Lieutenant Colonel M.A.G. Osmani was the commanding officer. He served as the general staff officer second grade at the CENTO Headquarters in Ankara, Turkey. He was promoted to the rank of lieutenant colonel on 22 September 1966 and became the CO of the 5th East Bengal Regiment. On 16 May 1970, he was promoted to the rank of colonel and posted to I Corps headquarters. He was promoted to the rank of brigadier on 29 May 1971. During the Bangladesh Liberation War, he was posted in general headquarters as a director of the Defense Security Force.

=== Bangladesh Army ===
He repatriated to Bangladesh in 1973 after its independence in 1971. He was the director general of Bangladesh Rifles from 22 February 1974 to 31 October 1975. On 15 May 1975, he was promoted to the rank of major general. He was the director general during the assassination of Sheikh Mujibur Rahman, the president of Bangladesh. He later stated that the BDR was ready for action but he chose not to follow through after he heard the three service chiefs pledge their loyalty on Bangladesh Radio.

He pledged allegiance to the new government on Bangladesh Radio after the assassination. He became chief of defence staff (CDS), whose position and power were above the chiefs of the three defence forces after the 15 August coup.

After the 7 November coup, he prevented General Zia from being the chief martial law administrator (CMLA), by arguing that that position should lie with President Sayem. This hurt his relationship with Zia as it delayed Zia's plan of eventually taking over power.

== Political career ==
After retirement from the army, Rahman joined the Bangladesh Awami League. He contested in the 1986 parliamentary elections as a candidate of the Awami League from Jamalpur-5. He won the election and was elected to the parliament. In 1991, he contested from the same constituency but lost the election to Sirajul Haq. In 1996, he again participated in the election but this time as a candidate of Gono Forum. He lost the election to Rezaul Karim Hira.

== Books ==
- কাছে থেকে দেখা (১৯৭৩-১৯৭৫)
- পূর্বাপর ১৯৭১ পাকিস্তান সেনা-গহ্বর থেকে দেখা

== Awards and decorations ==

Tamgha-e-Jang 1965 War (War Medal 1965)	Tamgha-e-Jamhuria (Republic Commemoration Medal) 1956

== Death ==
He died on 20 April 2009. "He was buried in his family graveyard at his ancestral home in Kharkharia village, Nandina."
