= Shah Md. Wares Ali Mamun =

Bangladeshi politician

- শাহ মোঃ ওয়ারেছ আলী মামুন

Member of the Bangladesh Parliament for Jamalpur-5
- Incumbent
- Assumed office 17 February 2026
- Preceded by: Abul Kalam Azad

Personal details
- Born: January 2, 1968 (age 58)q Jamalpur Sadar Upazila, Jamalpur District
- Party: Bangladesh Nationalist Party

Shah Md. Wares Ali Mamun is a Bangladeshi politician of the Bangladesh Nationalist Party. He is currently serving as a member of parliament from Jamalpur-5.

== Early life ==
Mamun was born on 2 January 1968 in Jamalpur Sadar Upazila in Jamalpur District.
