= Shamsul Islam (Jamalpur politician) =

Bangladeshi politician

- সামছুল ইসলাম

Member of Parliament for Jamalpur-4
- In office 3 March 1988 – 6 December 1990
- Preceded by: Shah Newaz
- Succeeded by: Abdus Salam Talukder

Personal details
- Born: Jamalpur
- Party: Jatiya Party

Shamsul Islam is a politician from Jamalpur District of Bangladesh. He was elected a member of parliament from Jamalpur-4 in 1988 Bangladeshi general election.

== Career ==
Shamsul Islam was elected a member of parliament from the Jamalpur-4 constituency as an independent candidate in the 1988 Bangladeshi general election.
