= Jamalpur-4 =

Constituency of Bangladesh's Jatiya Sangsad

Coordinates: 24.75°N 89.84°E

- Constituency for the Jatiya Sangsad
- District: Jamalpur District
- Division: Mymensingh Division
- Electorate: 304,992 (2026)

Current constituency
- Created: 1978
- Party: Bangladesh Nationalist Party
- Member: Md. Faridul Kabir Talukder
- ← 140 Jamalpur-3 142 Jamalpur-5 →

Jamalpur-4 is a constituency represented in the Jatiya Sangsad (National Parliament) of Bangladesh since 2026 by Md. Faridul Kabir Talukder of the Bangladesh Nationalist Party.

== Boundaries ==
The constituency encompasses Sarishabari Upazila.

== History ==
The constituency was created in 1978 from a Mymensingh constituency when the former Mymensingh District was split into two districts: Jamalpur and Mymensingh.

Ahead of the 2008 general election, the Election Commission redrew constituency boundaries to reflect population changes revealed by the 2001 Bangladesh census. The 2008 redistricting altered the boundaries of the constituency.

Ahead of the 2018 general election, the Election Commission reduced the boundaries of the constituency by removing two union parishads of Jamalpur Sadar Upazila: Meshta and Titpalla.

== Members of Parliament ==
Election	Member	Party
1979	Abdus Salam Talukder	Bangladesh Nationalist Party
Major Boundary Changes
1986	Shah Newaz	Communist Party of Bangladesh
1988	Shamsul Islam	Jatiya Party
1991	Abdus Salam Talukder	Bangladesh Nationalist Party
Jun 1996	Md. Nurul Islam	Awami League
2001	Anwarul Kabir Talukdar	Bangladesh Nationalist Party
2008	Murad Hasan	Awami League
2014	Mamunur Rashid	Jatiya Party (Ershad)
2018	Murad Hasan	Awami League
2024	Abdur Rashid	Independent
2026	Md. Faridul Kabir Talukder	Bangladesh Nationalist Party

== Elections ==
=== Elections in the 2020s ===
General Election 2026: Jamalpur-4
Party	Candidate	Votes	%	±%
BNP	Md. Faridul Kabir Talukder	147,406	75.3	N/A
Jamaat	Mohammad Abdul Awal	44,947	23.0	N/A
CPB	Md. Mahbub Zaman Jewel	1,314	0.7	N/A
IAB	Md. Ali Akbar	1,302	0.7	N/A
GOP	Md. Iqbal Hossain	383	0.2	N/A
Nagorik Oikko	Md. Kabir Hasan	379	0.2	N/A
Majority		102,459	52.3	N/A
Turnout		195,731	64.2	N/A
BNP gain from Independent				

=== Elections in the 2010s ===
General Election 2014: Jamalpur-4
Party	Candidate	Votes	%	±%
JP(E)	Mamunur Rashid	49,255	74.2	N/A
BNF	Mostafa Babul	17,124	25.8	N/A
Majority		32,131	48.4	+29.4
Turnout		66,379	24.9	−63.9
JP(E) gain from AL				

=== Elections in the 2000s ===
General Election 2008: Jamalpur-4
Party	Candidate	Votes	%	±%
AL	Murad Hasan	126,433	59.4	+16.0
BNP	Faridul Kabir Talukdar Shamim	85,955	40.4	−3.0
KSJL	Habibar Rahman Talukdar	540	0.3	+0.3
Majority		40,478	19.0	+7.0
Turnout		212,928	88.8	+12.0
AL gain from BNP				

General Election 2001: Jamalpur-4
Party	Candidate	Votes	%	±%
BNP	Anwarul Kabir Talukdar	89,414	55.4	+10.2
AL	Md. Nurul Islam	70,062	43.4	−8.1
Independent	Md. Abul Hossain	875	0.5	N/A
IJOF	Mohammad Khalilur Rahman Siddiqi	776	0.5	N/A
CPB	Md. Munir Uddin	213	0.1	N/A
KSJL	Md. Harunur Rashid	74	0.0	N/A
Independent	Md. Shamsul Haq	64	0.0	N/A
Majority		19,352	12.0	+5.7
Turnout		161,478	76.8	+2.0
BNP gain from AL				

=== Elections in the 1990s ===
General Election June 1996: Jamalpur-4
Party	Candidate	Votes	%	±%
AL	Md. Nurul Islam	63,379	51.5	+11.0
BNP	Abdus Salam Talukder	55,669	45.2	−10.4
JP(E)	Md. Mozammel Haque	2,450	2.0	+1.1
Jamaat	Mohammad Abdul Awal	1,182	1.0	−0.7
Independent	Md. Abdus Samad	278	0.2	N/A
Zaker Party	Khandakar Nuruzzaman	155	0.1	N/A
Majority		7,710	6.3	−8.8
Turnout		123,113	74.8	+20.8
AL gain from BNP				

General Election 1991: Jamalpur-4
Party	Candidate	Votes	%	±%
BNP	Abdus Salam Talukder	46,152	55.6	
AL	Matiur Rahman	33,611	40.5	
Jamaat	Ansar Uddin	1,412	1.7	
JP(E)	Shamsul Islam Manzu	784	0.9	
Bangladesh Samajtantrik Dal (Khalekuzzaman)	Suruzzaman Akond	652	0.8	
Jatiya Samajtantrik Dal-JSD	M. L. Faruk	330	0.4	
Majority		12,541	15.1	
Turnout		82,941	54.0	
BNP gain from				
