= Mohammad Reza Khan (politician) =

Bangladeshi politician

Member of Bangladesh Parliament
- In office 1988–1990
- Preceded by: Khalilur Rahman
- Succeeded by: Sirajul Haq

Mohammad Reza Khan (Bengali: মোহাম্মদ রেজা খান) is a politician in Bangladesh and a former member of parliament for Jamalpur-5.

== Career ==
Khan was elected to parliament from Jamalpur-5 as a Combined opposition candidate in 1988.
