= Md. Faridul Kabir Talukder =

Bangladeshi politician

- মোঃ ফরিদুল কবীর তালুকদার

Member of the Bangladesh Parliament for Jamalpur-4
- Incumbent
- Assumed office 17 February 2026
- Preceded by: Abdur Rashid

Personal details
- Born: January 17, 1967 (age 59)q Sarishabari Upazila, Jamalpur District
- Party: Bangladesh Nationalist Party

Md. Faridul Kabir Talukder is a Bangladeshi politician of the Bangladesh Nationalist Party. He is currently serving as a member of parliament from Jamalpur-4.

== Early life ==
Talukder was born on 17 January 1967 in Sarishabari Upazila in Jamalpur District.
