= Mozaffar Hossain =

Mozaffar Hossain may refer to:

- Mozaffar Hossain (Jamalpur politician)
- Mozaffar Hossain (Bogra politician)
