= Md. Mustafizur Rahman Babul =

Bangladeshi politician

- মোঃ মোস্তাফিজুর রহমান বাবুল

Member of the Bangladesh Parliament for Jamalpur-3
- Incumbent
- Assumed office 17 February 2026
- Preceded by: Mirza Azam

Personal details
- Born: February 3, 1961 (age 65)q Melandaha Upazila, Jamalpur District
- Party: Bangladesh Nationalist Party

Md. Mustafizur Rahman Babul is a Bangladeshi politician of the Bangladesh Nationalist Party. He is currently serving as a member of parliament from Jamalpur-3.

== Early life ==
Babul was born on 3 February 1961 in Melandaha Upazila in Jamalpur District.
