= Jamalpur-5 =

Constituency of Bangladesh's Jatiya Sangsad

Coordinates: 24.93°N 89.94°E

- Constituency for the Jatiya Sangsad
- District: Jamalpur District
- Division: Mymensingh Division
- Electorate: 576,810 (2026)

Current constituency
- Created: 1978
- Party: Bangladesh Nationalist Party
- Member: Shah Md. Wares Ali Mamun
- ← 141 Jamalpur-4 143 Sherpur-1 →

Jamalpur-5 is a constituency represented in the Jatiya Sangsad (National Parliament) of Bangladesh since 2026 by Shah Md. Wares Ali Mamun of the Bangladesh Nationalist Party.

== Boundaries ==
The constituency encompasses Jamalpur Sadar Upazila.

== History ==
The constituency was created in 1978 from a Mymensingh constituency when the former Mymensingh District was split into two districts: Jamalpur and Mymensingh.

Ahead of the 2008 general election, the Election Commission redrew constituency boundaries to reflect population changes revealed by the 2001 Bangladesh census. The 2008 redistricting altered the boundaries of the constituency.

Ahead of the 2018 general election, the Election Commission expanded the boundaries of the constituency by adding two union parishads of Jamalpur Sadar Upazila: Meshta and Titpalla.

== Members of Parliament ==
| Election | Member | Party |
|---|---|---|
| 1979 | Syed Abdus Sobhan | Awami League |
Major Boundary Changes
| 1986 | Khalilur Rahman | Awami League |
| 1988 | Mohammad Reza Khan | Jatiya Party |
| 1991 | Sirajul Haq | Bangladesh Nationalist Party |
| Feb 1996 | Sirajul Haq | Bangladesh Nationalist Party |
| Jun 1996 | Rezaul Karim Hira | Awami League |
| 2018 | Mozaffar Hossain | Awami League |
| 2024 | Md Abul Kalam Azad | Awami League |
| 2026 | Shah Md. Wares Ali Mamun | Bangladesh Nationalist Party |

== Elections ==
=== Elections in the 2020s ===
General Election 2026: Jamalpur-5
| Party | Candidate | Votes | % | ±% |
|---|---|---|---|---|
| BNP | Shah Md. Wares Ali Mamun | 199,344 | 61.8 | N/A |
| Jamaat | Muhammad Abdus Sattar | 113,201 | 35.1 | N/A |
| IAB | Syed Yunus Ahmed | 4,282 | 1.3 | N/A |
| Jatiya Party (M) | Md. Babar Ali Khan | 3,739 | 1.2 | N/A |
| JSD (Rab) | Md. Amir Uddin | 580 | 0.2 | N/A |
| CPB | Sheikh Md. Akkas Ali | 547 | 0.2 | N/A |
| GOP | Zakir Hossain | 539 | 0.2 | N/A |
| BCP | Abu Sayem Muhammad Sa'-adat-ul Karim | 225 | 0.1 | N/A |
| Majority | | 86,143 | 26.7 | N/A |
| Turnout | | 322,457 | 55.9 | N/A |
| BNP gain from AL | | | | |

=== Elections in the 2010s ===
General Election 2014: Jamalpur-5
| Party | Candidate | Votes | % | ±% |
|---|---|---|---|---|
| AL | Rezaul Karim Hira | 19,771 | 97.4 | +28.7 |
| JP(E) | Babar Ali Khan | 526 | 2.6 | N/A |
| Majority | | 19,245 | 94.8 | +56.6 |
| Turnout | | 20,297 | 5.4 | −80.1 |
| AL hold | | | | |

=== Elections in the 2000s ===
General Election 2008: Jamalpur-5
| Party | Candidate | Votes | % | ±% |
|---|---|---|---|---|
| AL | Rezaul Karim Hira | 198,899 | 68.7 | +13.0 |
| BNP | Sirajul Haq | 88,118 | 30.4 | −11.9 |
| JSD | Md. Tazuddin | 946 | 0.3 | N/A |
| KSJL | Abu Mohammad Ahsan Kabir | 874 | 0.3 | N/A |
| Zaker Party | Abul Allama Md. Jasim Uddin | 452 | 0.2 | N/A |
| BDB | Mohammad Ali Zinnah | 395 | 0.1 | N/A |
| Majority | | 110,781 | 38.2 | +24.9 |
| Turnout | | 289,684 | 85.5 | +7.9 |
| AL hold | | | | |

General Election 2001: Jamalpur-5
| Party | Candidate | Votes | % | ±% |
|---|---|---|---|---|
| AL | Rezaul Karim Hira | 150,240 | 55.7 | −4.8 |
| BNP | Sirajul Haq | 114,232 | 42.3 | +6.3 |
| IJOF | Md. Nazrul Islam | 4,854 | 1.8 | N/A |
| Independent | Mohammad Ali Jinnah | 358 | 0.1 | N/A |
| Jatiya Party (M) | Babar Ali Khan | 191 | 0.1 | N/A |
| Majority | | 36,008 | 13.3 | −9.4 |
| Turnout | | 269,875 | 77.6 | +1.4 |
| AL hold | | | | |

=== Elections in the 1990s ===
General Election June 1996: Jamalpur-5
| Party | Candidate | Votes | % | ±% |
|---|---|---|---|---|
| AL | Rezaul Karim Hira | 130,806 | 60.5 | +15.5 |
| BNP | Sirajul Haq | 77,865 | 36.0 | −12.5 |
| Jamaat | Md. Majibur Rahman | 5,847 | 2.7 | N/A |
| Gano Forum | Khalilur Rahman | 685 | 0.3 | N/A |
| Zaker Party | Khandakar Nuruzzaman | 485 | 0.2 | −0.2 |
| Independent | Md. Joynul Abedin | 483 | 0.2 | N/A |
| Independent | Mohammad Ali | 200 | 0.1 | N/A |
| Majority | | 52,941 | 24.5 | +21.0 |
| Turnout | | 216,371 | 76.2 | +27.4 |
| AL gain from BNP | | | | |

General Election 1991: Jamalpur-5
| Party | Candidate | Votes | % | ±% |
|---|---|---|---|---|
| BNP | Sirajul Haq | 70,392 | 48.5 | |
| AL | Khalilur Rahman | 65,320 | 45.0 | |
| Jatiya Oikkya Front | Ashraf Faruki | 2,607 | 1.8 | |
| Independent | Mujibor Rahman | 2,395 | 1.6 | |
| JP(E) | Nazim Uddin | 1,880 | 1.3 | |
| BKA | Kh. Abdul Matin | 826 | 0.6 | |
| Zaker Party | M. A. Kuddus | 557 | 0.4 | |
| Bangladesh Muslim League (Kader) | Md. A. Aziz | 557 | 0.4 | |
| Jatiya Samajtantrik Dal-JSD | A. Hakim | 459 | 0.3 | |
| Independent | Rezaul Karim Hira | 271 | 0.2 | |
| Majority | | 5,072 | 3.5 | |
| Turnout | | 145,264 | 48.8 | |
| BNP gain from | | | | |
