= Md. Nurul Islam (Bangladeshi politician) =

Bangladeshi politician

Maulana Md. Nurul Islam

Member of Bangladesh Parliament
- In office 1996–2001
- Preceded by: Abdus Salam Talukder
- Succeeded by: Anwarul Kabir Talukdar

Personal details
- Died: 11 November 2018 (aged 87) Dhaka, Bangladesh
- Party: Bangladesh Awami League

Maulana Md. Nurul Islam was a Bangladesh Awami League politician. He was a member of parliament for Jamalpur-4 and state minister for religious affairs in the first Hasina ministry (1996-2001).

== Career ==
In 1971, Islam was a teacher at Pogaldigha High School, Sarishabari thana, Jamalpur district.

Islam was elected to parliament from Jamalpur-4 as a Bangladesh Awami League candidate in 1996. He was state minister for religious affairs in the first Hasina ministry (1996-2001).

== Death ==
Islam died on 11 November 2018 at Apollo Hospital in Dhaka.
