= Jamalpur-3 =

Constituency of Bangladesh's Jatiya Sangsad

Coordinates: 24.98°N 89.83°E

- Constituency for the Jatiya Sangsad
- District: Jamalpur District
- Division: Mymensingh Division
- Electorate: 539,504 (2026)

Current constituency
- Created: 1978
- Party: Bangladesh Nationalist Party
- Member: Md. Mustafizur Rahman Babul
- ← 139 Jamalpur-2 141 Jamalpur-4 →

Jamalpur-3 is a constituency represented in the Jatiya Sangsad (National Parliament) of Bangladesh since 2026 by Md. Mustafizur Rahman Babul of the Bangladesh Nationalist Party.

== Boundaries ==
The constituency encompasses Madarganj and Melandaha upazilas.

== History ==
The constituency was created in 1978 from the Mymensingh-13 constituency when the former Mymensingh District was split into two districts: Jamalpur and Mymensingh.

Ahead of the 2008 general election, the Election Commission redrew constituency boundaries to reflect population changes revealed by the 2001 Bangladesh census. The 2008 redistricting altered the boundaries of the constituency.

Ahead of the 2014 general election, the Election Commission expanded the boundaries of the constituency. Previously it had excluded two union parishads of Melandaha Upazila: Mahmudpur and Shaympur.

== Members of Parliament ==
| Election | Member | Party |
|---|---|---|
| 1979 | Karimuzzaman Talukder | Awami League |
Major Boundary Changes
| 1986 | Shafiqul Islam Khoka | Bangladesh Krishak Sramik Awami League |
| 1988 | Shafiqul Islam Khoka | Jatiya Party |
| 1991 | Mirza Azam | Awami League |
| Feb 1996 | Abul Hossain | Bangladesh Nationalist Party |
| Jun 1996 | Mirza Azam | Awami League |
| 2001 | Mirza Azam | Awami League |
| 2008 | Mirza Azam | Awami League |
| 2014 | Mirza Azam | Awami League |
| 2018 | Mirza Azam | Awami League |
| 2024 | Mirza Azam | Awami League |
| 2026 | Md. Mustafizur Rahman Babul | Bangladesh Nationalist Party |

== Elections ==
=== Elections in the 2020s ===
General Election 2026: Jamalpur-3
| Party | Candidate | Votes | % | ±% |
|---|---|---|---|---|
| BNP | Md. Mustafizur Rahman Babul | 207,412 | 65.6 | N/A |
| Jamaat | Md. Mujibur Rahman Azadi | 81,430 | 25.8 | N/A |
| Independent | Sadiqur Rahman | 12,052 | 3.8 | N/A |
| Independent | Shiblul Bari Raju | 10,523 | 3.3 | N/A |
| IAB | Daulatuzzaman Ansari | 2,546 | 0.8 | N/A |
| JP(E) | Mir Shamsul Alam | 844 | 0.3 | N/A |
| GSA | Fidel Naim | 643 | 0.2 | N/A |
| GOP | Liton Mia | 412 | 0.1 | N/A |
| Independent | Farzana Farid | 284 | 0.1 | N/A |
| Majority | | 125,982 | 39.8 | N/A |
| Turnout | | 316,146 | 58.6 | N/A |
| BNP gain from AL | | | | |

=== Elections in the 2010s ===
Mirza Azam was re-elected unopposed in the 2014 general election after opposition parties withdrew their candidacies in a boycott of the election.

=== Elections in the 2000s ===
General Election 2008: Jamalpur-3
| Party | Candidate | Votes | % | ±% |
|---|---|---|---|---|
| AL | Mirza Azam | 171,926 | 63.1 | +14.2 |
| BNP | Md Mustafizur Rahman Babul | 99,113 | 36.4 | +31.8 |
| National People's Party | Md. Harun or Roshid | 1,144 | 0.4 | N/A |
| Bangladesh Krishak Sramik Awami League (1983–1991) | Md. Hasmot Ali | 302 | 0.1 | N/A |
| Majority | | 72,813 | 26.7 | +21.2 |
| Turnout | | 272,485 | 88.3 | +14.3 |
| AL hold | | | | |

General Election 2001: Jamalpur-3
| Party | Candidate | Votes | % | ±% |
|---|---|---|---|---|
| AL | Mirza Azam | 119,611 | 48.9 | −0.8 |
| Independent | Md. Mustafizur Rahman Babul | 106,258 | 43.4 | N/A |
| BNP | Shafiqul Islam Khoka | 11,274 | 4.6 | −23.1 |
| Independent | Md. Karimuzzaman Tarafder | 3,915 | 1.6 | N/A |
| Independent | Md. Ismat Pasha | 2,238 | 0.9 | N/A |
| IJOF | Dowlatuzzaman Ansari | 1,183 | 0.5 | N/A |
| Jatiya Party (M) | Md. Lutfar Rahman | 187 | 0.1 | N/A |
| Majority | | 13,353 | 5.5 | −16.5 |
| Turnout | | 244,666 | 74.0 | +10.1 |
| AL hold | | | | |

=== Elections in the 1990s ===
General Election June 1996: Jamalpur-3
| Party | Candidate | Votes | % | ±% |
|---|---|---|---|---|
| AL | Mirza Azam | 80,056 | 49.7 | +17.2 |
| BNP | Md. A. Hye | 44,666 | 27.7 | +2.4 |
| JP(E) | Shafiqul Islam Khoka | 28,692 | 17.8 | +14.6 |
| Jamaat | Nur Uddin Mian | 4,725 | 2.9 | N/A |
| CPB | Noim Jahangir | 2,132 | 1.3 | N/A |
| Bangladesh Muslim League (Jamir Ali) | Md. Harunur Rashid | 278 | 0.2 | N/A |
| Bangladesh Sarbahara Party | Md. Abul Hasan Mandal | 248 | 0.2 | N/A |
| Zaker Party | S. M. Abdul Mannan | 241 | 0.2 | −1.3 |
| Majority | | 35,390 | 22.0 | +14.8 |
| Turnout | | 161,038 | 63.9 | +19.2 |
| AL hold | | | | |

General Election 1991: Jamalpur-3
| Party | Candidate | Votes | % | ±% |
|---|---|---|---|---|
| AL | Mirza Azam | 39,907 | 32.5 | |
| BNP | Shah Md. Khairul Bashar Chishti | 31,032 | 25.3 | |
| Independent | Abul Hossain | 19,121 | 15.6 | |
| Independent | Md. Mokhlesur Rahman | 12,081 | 9.8 | |
| Independent | Md. Mosharraf Hossain | 5,575 | 4.5 | |
| JP(E) | Shahidul Islam Khoka | 3,892 | 3.2 | |
| Oikkya Prakriyya | Noim Jahangir | 2,567 | 2.1 | |
| BKA | Ruhul Amin | 1,984 | 1.6 | |
| Bangladesh Janata Party | Rezabuddaula Chowdhury | 1,928 | 1.6 | |
| Zaker Party | Kismat Pasha | 1,867 | 1.5 | |
| Jatiya Samajtantrik Dal-JSD | Shamchul Huda | 777 | 0.6 | |
| Independent | Jamal Uddin | 586 | 0.5 | |
| FP | Md. Nurul Haq Zangi | 427 | 0.3 | |
| Independent | A. K. M. Hasan Hazari | 338 | 0.3 | |
| Independent | Md. Abdul Kader | 275 | 0.2 | |
| JSD (S) | Shahjahan | 201 | 0.2 | |
| Independent | Abul Hasnat M. | 96 | 0.1 | |
| Bangladesh Muslim League (Kader) | Azizul Haq Sarkar | 60 | 0.0 | |
| Majority | | 8,875 | 7.2 | |
| Turnout | | 122,714 | 44.7 | |
| AL gain from Bangladesh Krishak Sramik Awami League (1983–1991) | | | | |
