= Abul Hossain (disambiguation) =

Abul Hossain is a Muslim given name. It may refer to:

- Abul Husayn Muslim ibn al-Hajjaj Qushayri Nishapuri (815–875), Islamic scholar
- Abu al-Husain al-Nuri (840–908), Persian Sufi mystic
- Abu al-Husayn Bajkam al-Makani (died 941), Turkish Abbasid military commander
- Abu'l-Husain Utbi (died 982), Samanid vizier
- ʾAbū al-Ḥusayn ʾAḥmad ibn Fāris ibn Zakariyyā (died 1004), Persian linguist, scribe, scholar, philologist and lexicographer
- Abu al-Husayn al-Basri (died 1044), jurist and theologian
- Abu al-Husayn Abd'r-Rahman ibn Ibrahim Sori (1762–1829), enslaved Fula prince
- Abul Hussain (1922–2014), Bangladeshi poet
- Abul Hossain Lalmonirhati (1935–2016), Bangladeshi politician and freedom fighter
- Syed Abul Hossain (born 1951), Bangladeshi businessman and former minister
- Abul Hossain Chandpuri (born 1957), Bangladeshi footballer
- Abul Hossain (born 1962), Bangladeshi Army general
- Abul Hossain Tarun (died 1997), Bangladeshi politician
- Professor Abul Hossain, Bangladeshi politician from Rajshahi
- Abul Hossain (Jamalpur politician)
- Abul Hossain Khan, Bangladeshi politician
- Abul Hossain Mia, Bangladeshi politician
- Mohamed Abul Hossain Abul (born 1983), Bangladeshi footballer

== See also ==
- Abu Hussain Sarkar (1894–1969), Bengali politician
- Sayed Abu Hossain (born 1956), Bangladeshi politician
