= Anwarul Kabir Talukdar =

Bangladeshi politician (1944–2020)

- আনোয়ারুল কবির তালুকদার

State Minister of Finance and Planning
- In office 28 October 2001 – 20 May 2006

State Minister of Power
- In office 21 May 2006 – 30 September 2006
- Preceded by: A. K. M. Mosharraf Hossain
- Succeeded by: Abdus Sattar Bhuiyan

Member of Parliament for Jamalpur-4
- In office 28 October 2001 – 27 October 2006
- Preceded by: Md. Nurul Islam
- Succeeded by: Murad Hasan

Personal details
- Born: 1 January 1944 Jamalpur, Bengal, British India
- Died: 10 May 2020 (aged 76) Dhaka, Bangladesh
- Cause of death: COVID-19
- Party: Bangladesh Nationalist Party; Liberal Democratic Party
- Relatives: Abdus Salam Talukder (uncle)

Military service
- Allegiance: Bangladesh; Pakistan (before 1971)
- Branch/service: Bangladesh Army; Pakistan Army
- Years of service: 1967–1998
- Rank: Major General
- Unit: Regiment of Artillery
- Commands: GOC of 66th Infantry Division; Director of Military Operations, Army Headquarters; Station Commander, Rangpur; Commander of 222nd Infantry Brigade; Commander of 24th Artillery Brigade
- Battles/wars: Bangladesh Liberation War

Anwarul Kabir Talukdar (1 January 1944 – 10 May 2020) was a politician of the Bangladesh Nationalist Party and the Liberal Democratic Party. He was a Jatiya Sangsad member representing the Jamalpur-4 constituency and state minister of power.

== Career ==
Talukdar served in the Bangladesh Army and retired as a major general. He was elected to parliament from Jamalpur-4. He was the state minister for planning and finance, and later served as the state minister of power in the second Khaleda cabinet. He resigned his post to protest corruption in the power sector. The Bangladesh Nationalist Party government reported that he had not resigned but in fact had been sacked from his ministerial post by the government.

Talukdar resigned from the Bangladesh Nationalist Party on 26 October 2006. According to him, he resigned to protest the corruption in the power sector of Bangladesh under the Bangladesh Nationalist Party government. He joined the Liberal Democratic Party (LDP) formed that year by him, AQM Badruddoza Chowdhurym and Oli Ahmed. He resigned from the LDP on 5 January 2009.

== Personal life ==
Talukdar was the nephew of Abdus Salam Talukder (1936–1999), a former minister and a secretary general of the Bangladesh Nationalist Party.

== Death ==
Talukdar died on 10 May 2020 from COVID-19.
