= Sarishabari Upazila =

Sarishabari সরিষাবাড়ী
- Upazila
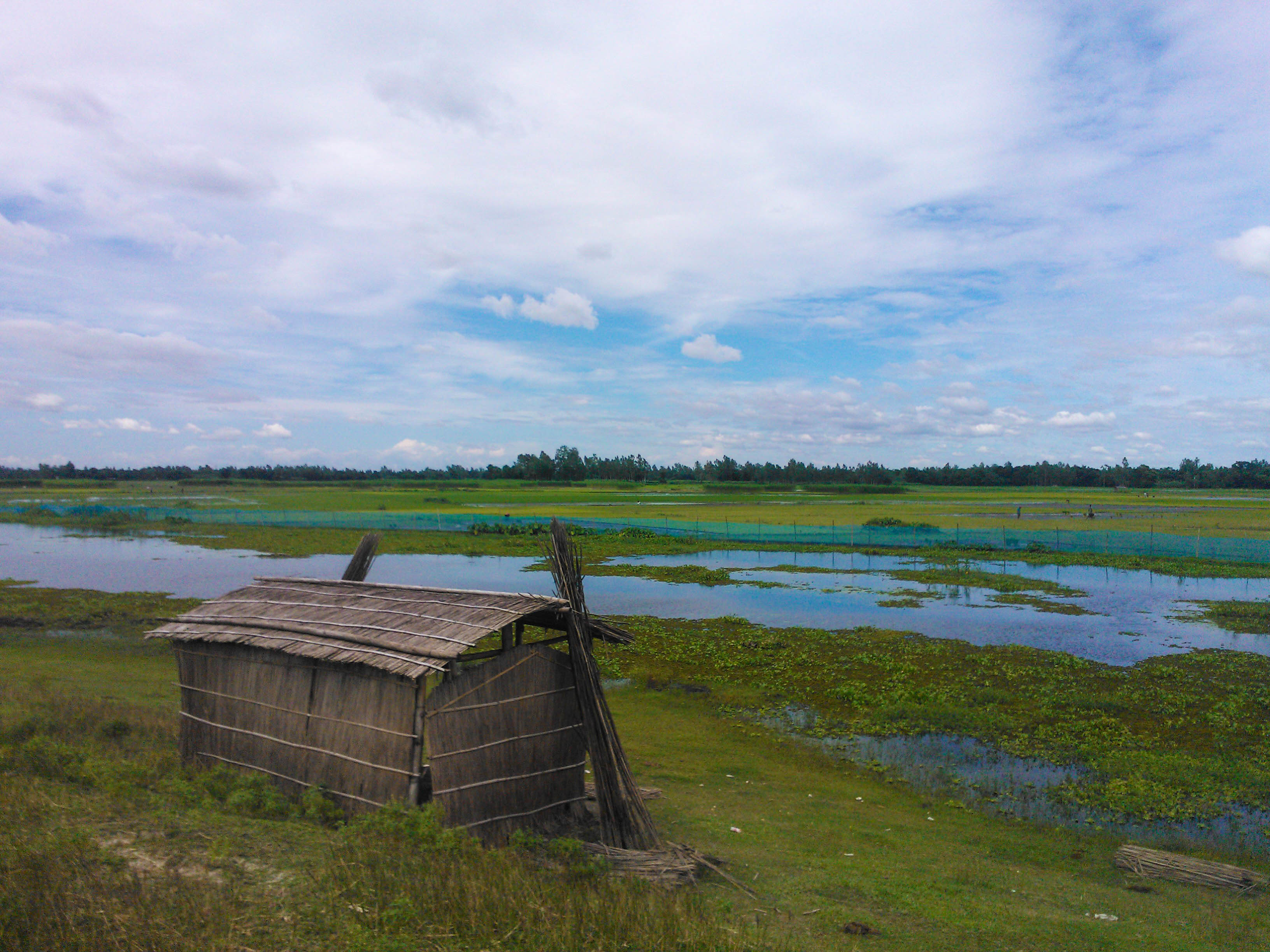
- Countryside of Sarishabari

- Coordinates: 24°44.5′N 89°50′E
- Country: Bangladesh
- Division: Mymensingh Division
- District: Jamalpur District

Area
  - Total: 263.50 km^{2} (101.74 sq mi)

Population (2022)
  - Total: 343,194
  - Density: 1,302.4/km^{2} (3,373.3/sq mi)
- Time zone: UTC+6 (BST)
- Postal code: 2050
- Area code: 09827
- Website: sarishabari.jamalpur.gov.bd

Sarishabari Upazila mauza geocode map

Sarishabari (Bengali: সরিষাবাড়ী) is an upazila of Jamalpur District in the Division of Mymensingh, Bangladesh.

== Geography ==
Sarishabari has 58,254 households and total area 263.50 km^{2}. The upazila is bounded by Madarganj and Jamalpur Sadar upazilas on the north, Tangail district of Dhaka division to the east, and Sirajganj and Bogra districts of Rajshahi division to the west.

== Demographics ==
Historical population
Year	Pop.	±%
1981	224,966	—
1991	289,106	+28.5%
2001	316,007	+9.3%
2011	325,320	+2.9%
2022	343,194	+5.5%
Source: Bangladesh Bureau of Statistics

Religions in Sarishabari Upazila (2022)
Religion	Percent
Islam	97.52%
Hinduism	2.46%
Other or not stated	0.02%

According to the 2022 Bangladeshi census, Sarishabari Upazila had 89,171 households and a population of 343,194. 8.75% of the population were under 5 years of age. Sarishabari had a literacy rate (age 7 and over) of 64.42%: 66.77% for males and 56.44% for females, and a sex ratio of 93.44 males for 100 females. 68,285 (19.90%) lived in urban areas.

== Administration ==
Sarishabari Thana was formed in 1960 and it was turned into an upazila in 1983.

Sarishabari Upazila is divided into Sarishabari Municipality and eight union parishads: Aona, Bhatara, Doail, Kamrabad, Mahadan, Pingna, Pogaldigha, and Satpoa. The union parishads are subdivided into 113 mauzas and 183 villages.

== Notable people ==
- Maulana Muhammad Nurul Islam (1931–2018), state minister of religious affairs
- Abdus Salam Talukder (1936–1999), lawyer and government minister
- Anwarul Kabir Talukdar (1944–2020), major general and state minister
- Muhammad Anisur Rahman Anu (born 1956), academic, economist and political activist
- Muhammad Samad (born 1956), pro-vice chancellor of the University of Dhaka
- Murad Hasan (born 1974), former state minister
- Mahmudul Hasan Sohag (born 1981), founder of Rokomari.com
- Md Ismail Hossain (died 2016), 14th Inspector General of Bangladesh Police

== See also ==
- Upazilas of Bangladesh
- Districts of Bangladesh
- Divisions of Bangladesh
