= Jamalpur Zilla School =

Public High School in Bangladesh

- জামালপুর জিলা স্কুল

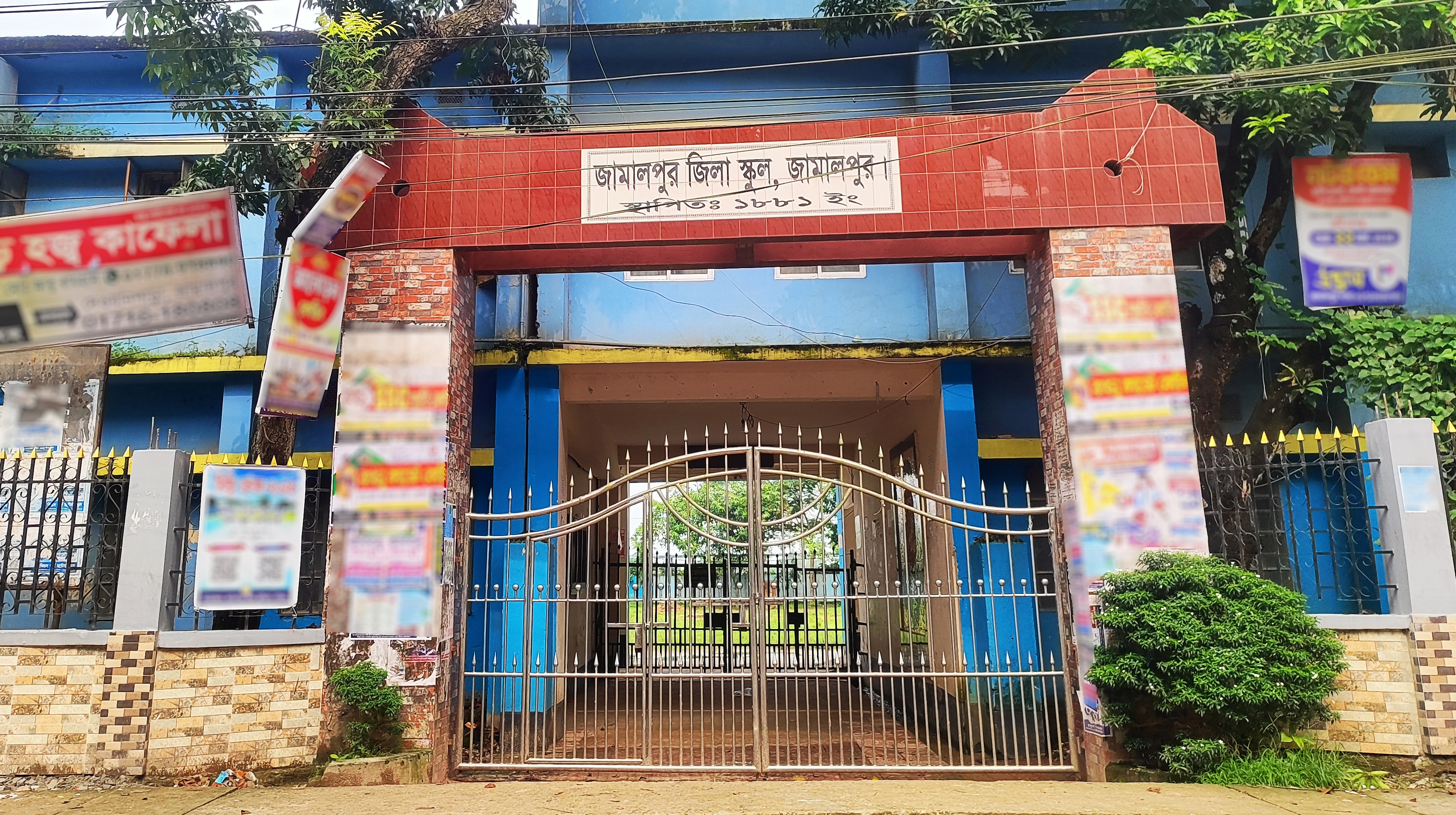
- Main gate of Jamalpur Zilla School

Location
- Amlapara; Jamalpur Sadar, Jamalpur., 2000; Bangladesh; 24.9331°N 89.9429°E

Information
- Other name: JZS
- Former name: Dono High School
- Motto: Knowledge is power.
- Established: May 5, 1881; 145 years ago
- Founder: T. A. Dono
- School board: Mymensingh Education Board
- School code: EIIN 109873
- Headmaster: F. M. Imamur Rashid
- Gender: Boys
- Age range: 8-16 (approximately)
- Enrollment: 1500+
- Classes: 3 - 10
- Language: Bengali
- Campus size: 12.7 acres (5.1 ha)
- Colors: White Shirt; Khaki Pant
- Sports: Kabaddi, Badminton, Cricket, Football
- Website: www.jzs.edu.bd

Jamalpur Zilla School (JZS) is a public high school in Jamalpur District and one of the oldest schools in Bangladesh.

== History ==
Jamalpur Zilla School was founded by T. A. Dono, the Sub Divisional Officer (SDO) of Jamalpur. It was upgraded to entrance level and named Dono High School in 1881. The school was placed under government pay roll in 1882 and renamed Jamalpur Dono English High School. In 1912 it was renamed Jamalpur Government School and nationalised by the government. The school had two hostels, one for Muslim students and another for Hindu students. The school has seven labs of which two are computer labs. It is one of the best schools in terms of graduation rates and grades in Bangladesh.

== Infrastructure ==
This school, located in the city of Jamalpur, is established on a total of 12.07 acres of land. It consists of three multi-story academic buildings, one ground floor building, two single-story buildings, one student dormitory, and 13 other facilities including a mosque.

== Student uniform ==
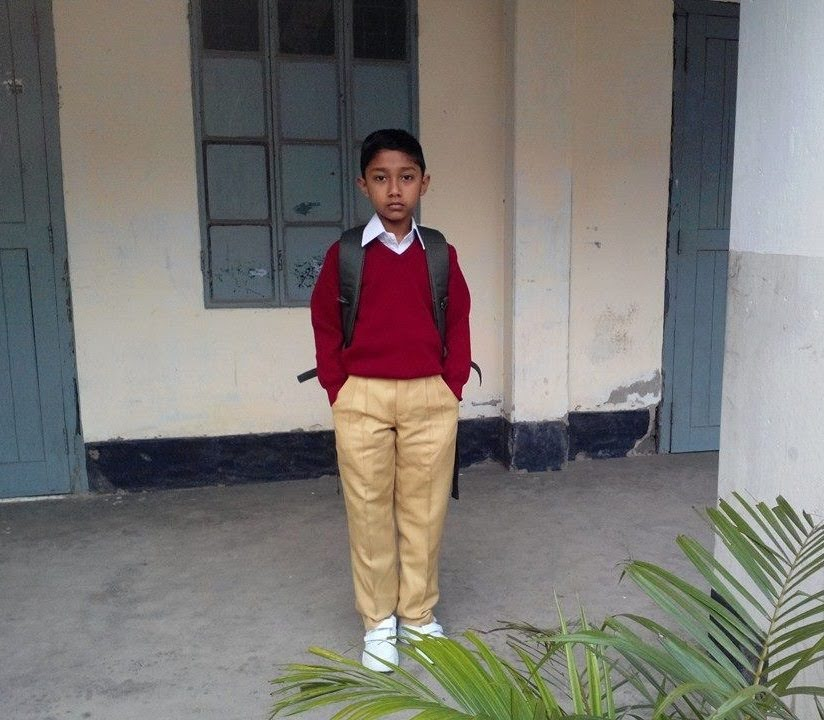
A student in full uniform in winter time

The prescribed uniform for students at the school is as follows:

- White half-sleeve shirt
- Khaki full pants
- White shoes
- Maroon sweater (in Winter)
- School badge with monogram (attached to the left pocket of the shirt)

== Notable alumni ==
- Mirza Azam MP, Former State Minister, Ministry of Textiles and Jute
- Abul Kalam Azad MP, Former Chief Secretary of Bangladesh
- Abdullah Al Mamun, actor
- Mirza Sultan Raja, politician
