= Mirza Azam =

Bangladeshi politician (born 1962)

- মির্জা আজম
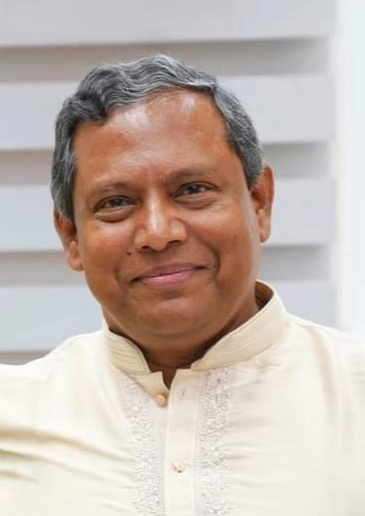

Minister of State for Textiles and Jute
- In office 12 January 2014 – 7 January 2019
- Prime Minister: Sheikh Hasina
- Minister: Emaz Uddin Pramanik

Member of the Bangladesh Parliament for Jamalpur-3
- In office 14 July 1996 – 6 August 2024
- Preceded by: Abul Hossain
- In office 5 March 1991 – 24 November 1995
- Preceded by: Shafiqul Islam Khoka
- Succeeded by: Abul Hossain

Organizing Secretary of Bangladesh Awami League
- Incumbent
- Assumed office 21 December 2022

Personal details
- Born: 13 September 1962 (age 64) Jamalpur, East Pakistan, Pakistan
- Party: Bangladesh Awami League
- Education: Jamalpur Zilla School; Govt. Ashek Mahmud College
- Occupation: Politician

Mirza Azam (born 13 September 1962) is a Bangladeshi politician and Organizing Secretary of Bangladesh Awami League. He was elected as a Member of Parliament six times and has served as Minister of State for Textiles and Jute. He was the general secretary of the Bangladesh Jubo League.

== Early life ==
Azam was born on 13 September 1962 at Sukhnagari village, Madarganj Upazila, Jamalpur District, East Pakistan, Pakistan. His mother was Mosammat Nurunnahar Begum. He was a well-known figure of student politics in Jamalpur.

== Career ==
Azam started his political career from student life in 1977. He was an Amusement and Entertainment Secretary of the Student union of Government Ashek Mahmud College in 1979. In 1981, he was elected vice-president of Chhatra League, Jamalpur District unit.

In 1991, he was elected as the President of Jubo League and Joint-General Secretary of Awami League, Jamalpur District Branch. He was elected to Parliament from Jamalpur-3 in 1991 as a candidate of Awami League. He received 39,907 votes while his nearest rival of Bangladesh Nationalist Party, Shah Md. Khairul Bashar Chishti, received 31,032 votes.

Azam was re-elected to Parliament from Jamalpur-3 in 1996 as a candidate of Awami League. In 1996, he was elected as the General Secretary of Bangladesh Awami League of Jamalpur District Branch. He served as the General Secretary of Bangladesh Awami Jubo League of the Central Executive Committee from 2003 to 2012. In January 2004, he was injured while on a protest by Bangladesh Police personnel. In June 2004, a bus in Shahbagh was burned down killing 11 after which police charged Azam, Jahangir Kabir Nanak and nine others. The charges were dropped in 2013 as the Criminal Investigation Department did not find evidence of their involvement.

Azam was re-elected to Parliament from Jamalpur-3 in 2001 as a candidate of Awami League. He was the Whip of Opposition Party in the 8th Bangladesh National Parliament.

In 2007, Rapid Action Battalion sued Azam for selling his Lexus, imported duty free due to member of parliament privileges, illegally using forged papers to Shawkat Ali director of Metro Spinning Limited. In November an arrest warrant was issued against Azam. In December, Judge Mohammad Azizul Haque ordered property of Azam to be seized. Anti-Corruption Commission sued him in another case over 5.3 million in unexplained wealth on 8 July 2008 with the Dhaka Chief Metropolitan Magistrate's . In July 2008, he was sent to jail after surrendering to Metropolitan Sessions Judge's Court. JMB leader Shaekh Abdur Rahman is allegedly his brother in law but Azam has denied any family ties.

Azam was re-elected to Parliament from Jamalpur-3 in 2008 as a candidate of Awami League against Mostafizur Rahman Babul of Bangladesh Nationalist Party. He was the Whip of Ruling Party of the 9th Bangladesh National Parliament. In February 2009, during the Bangladesh Rifles revolt he visited the Bangladesh Rifles headguards with Jahangir Kabir Nanak to negotiate with the rebels on behalf of the government.

Azam was re-elected to Parliament from Jamalpur-3 in 2014 unopposed after the election was boycotted by the opposition Bangladesh Nationalist Party. He has taken oath as the State Minister of Government of the People's Republic of Bangladesh on 12 January 2014. He has taken on his duties in the Ministry of Textiles and Jute on 13 January 2014.

Azam was re-elected in 2018 from Jamalpur-3 as a candidate of the Awami League. He received 385,113 votes while his nearest rival, Md Mostafizur Rahman Babul of Bangladesh Nationalist Party received 4,677 votes.

Azam has established around fifty educational institutions. Among these are Bangamata Sheikh Fojilatunnesa Mujib Science and Technology University and Sheikh Fazilatunnesa Mujib Fisheries College.

Azam's home was vandalized on 5 August 2024 following the fall of the Sheikh Hasina led Awami League government. It was again vandalized in February 2025.
