= Khorka Beel =

Famous beel is located in Jamalpur in Bangladesh

- খরকা বিল
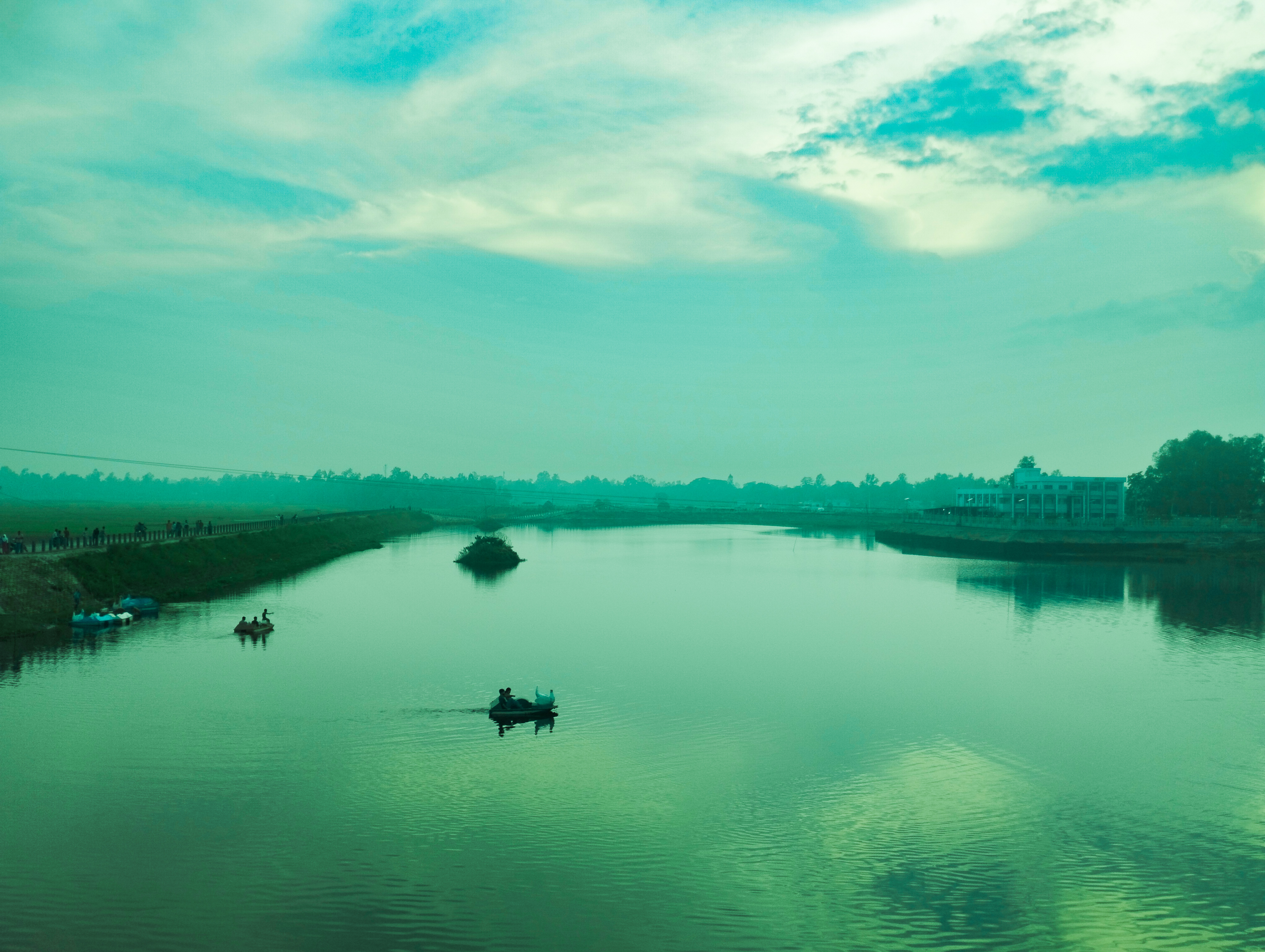
- An ethereal calm settles over Khorka Beel

- Location of Khorka Beel on the map of Bangladesh
- Location: Madarganj Upazila
- Coordinates: 24°53′41″N 89°43′32″E
- Type: Large Beel
- Primary inflows: Jamuna River
- Basin countries: Bangladesh
- Max. length: 7 kilometres (4.3 mi)
- Settlements: Madarganj Municipality, Jonail, Gabergram, Tartapara

Khorka Beel (Bengali: খরকা বিল) is a waterbody in Madarganj Upazila, Jamalpur District, in Bangladesh. In the past, it was directly connected to the Jamuna River, but today it is separated from the river.

== Geographical location ==
Khorka Beel is located in Madarganj Upazila of Jamalpur District in Mymensingh Division. It is connected to the villages of Jonail, Gabergram and Tartapara and extends to the north and south. It is about seven kilometers long from Madarganj Upazila Parishad to Jonail. There is a wide road running along the western side of this. It is known as Hawaii Road. From Balijuri Bazar, peoples can easily reach Khorka Beel via paved roads via autos, rickshaws, vans, bicycles, motor vehicles, buses, and microbuses.

A lot of changes have taken place in its geographical area due to the filling up of a vast area on the eastern side of the Beel for development projects. This change is likely to increase further in the future.

== History ==
The exact time of origin of Khorka Beel is unknown, but it is believed that it was created by a devastating earthquake in the early 19th century. Historically, Khorka Beel was known as the fish bowl of Madarganj for its depth and abundance of fish. The beel provided much of the Madarganj region's economy and fishery resources.

During the Bangladesh Liberation War, there was a camp of freedom fighters camp named Bodi Company beside the Khorka Beel, which bears historical significance in the region during the Liberation War. Various literary stories and poems have been written about Khorka Beel, which are part of the cultural significance of the Beel and local folklore.

A number of changes have been made to the beel recently. It is now one of the most popular tourist destinations in Jamalpur district. A beautiful bridge has been built here. The construction of a 260-meter-long bridge built by LGED over the Khorka Beel began in early 2020 and is currently awaiting inauguration.

The idea of the origin of the beel as a result of the earthquake highlights the close relationship between local folklore and the beel. Infrastructure development, such as the construction of bridges and highways, has boosted the tourism potential of beel. However, the management of construction work by filling the beel shows a conflict of development with environmental protection.

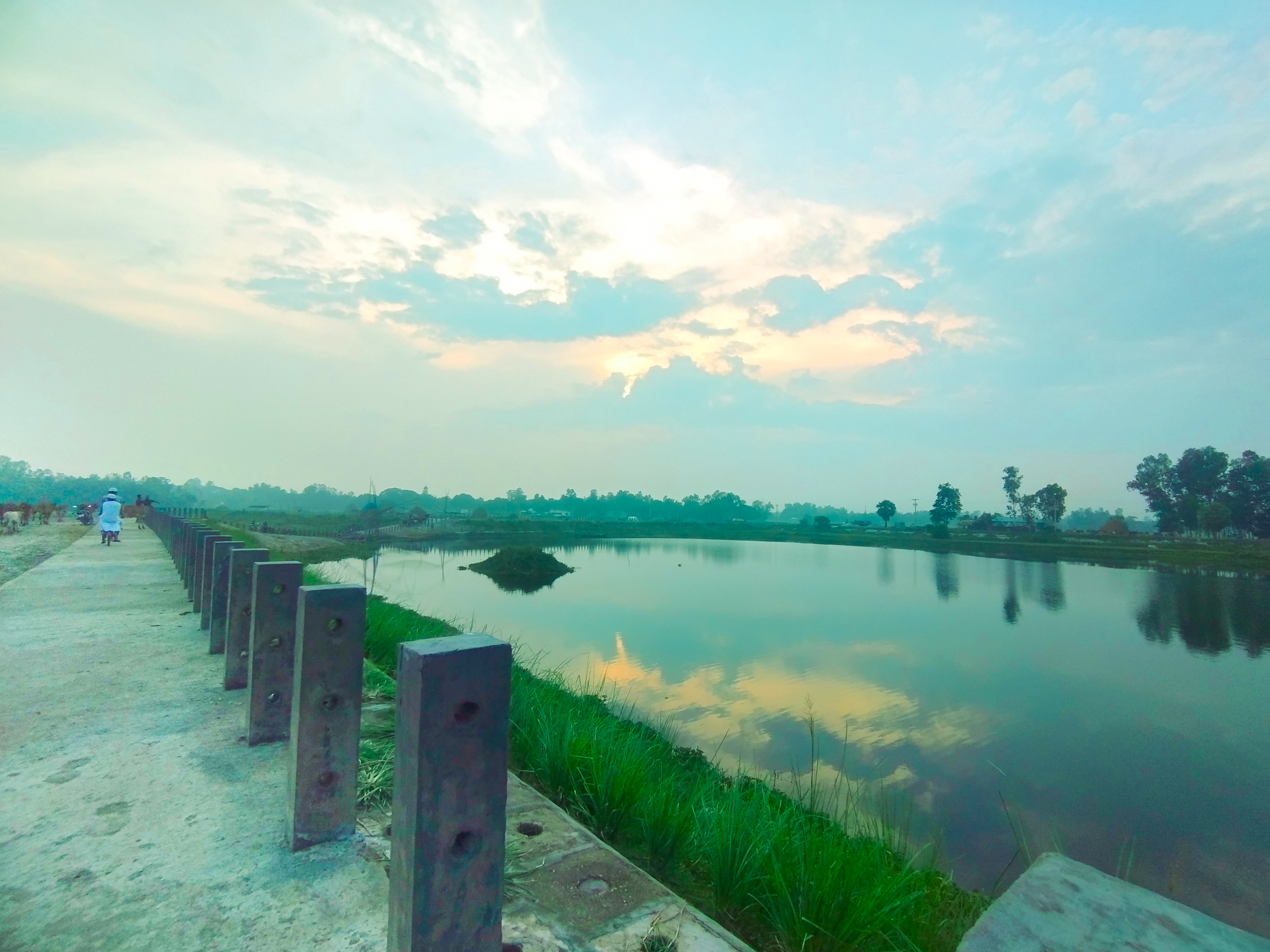
The new under construction along Khorka Beel

== Importance in local economy ==
The Khorka Beel was an important source of regional fishery resources. Hence, it came to be known as the fish bowl of Madarganj. Over time, it has transformed from a fish supplier to a tourist destination, highlighting its special effect in the local economy. As Madarganj is an agricultural area, the water of the beel has also made a special contribution to agriculture.

In recent times, various development initiatives have been developed around the beel. A beautiful bridge has been built, along with a wide Hawaii Road, which is now one of the main attractions for tourists. The beel is planned to be built in the style of Hatirjheel. Along with the construction of a mini stadium and a modern municipal building next to the beel, it will attract tourists more by arranging walkways, tree plantations and lighting. This will increase the contribution of tourism to the economy of the surrounding region.

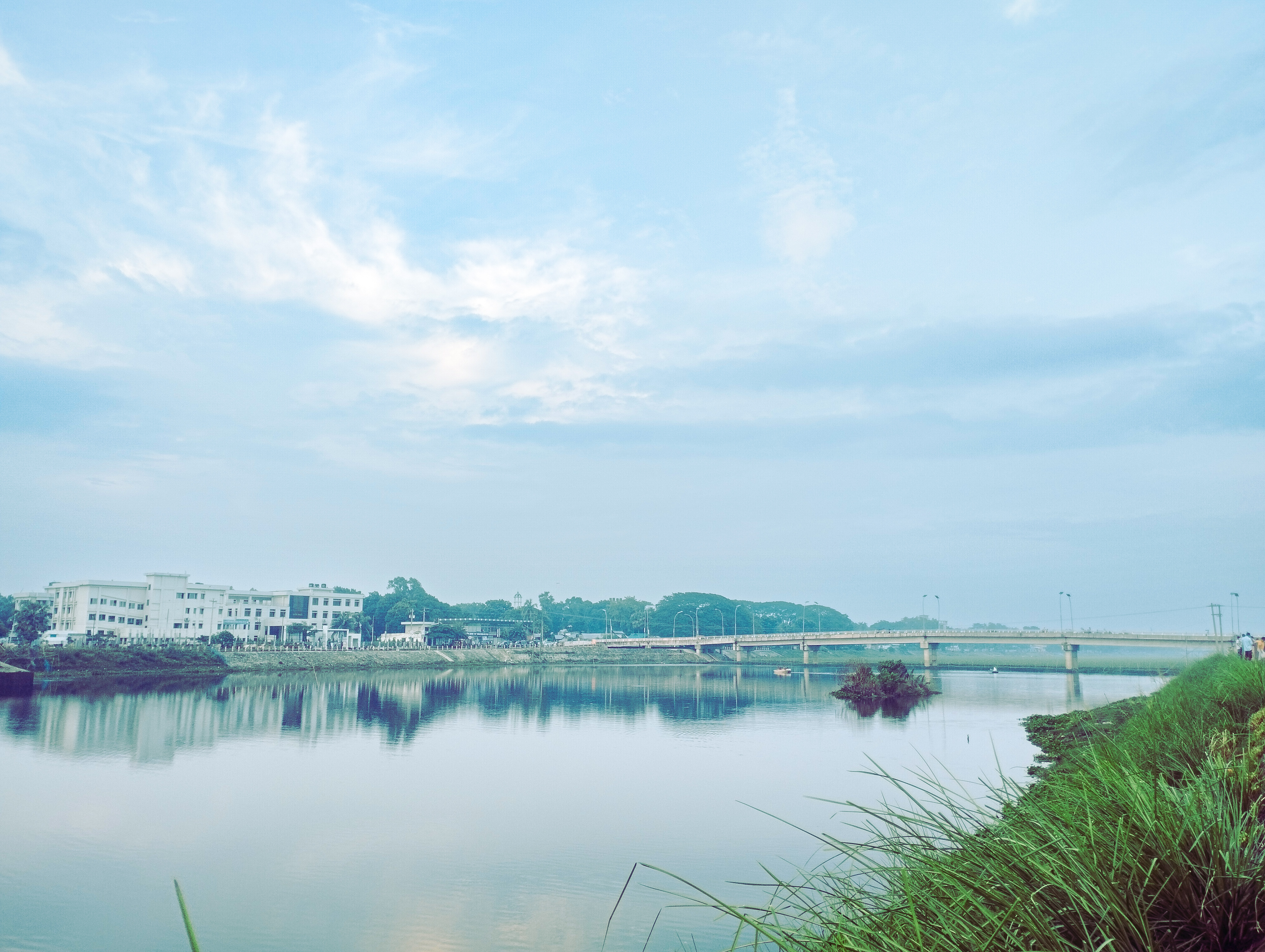
Khorka Bridge and modern municipal buildings from a distance.

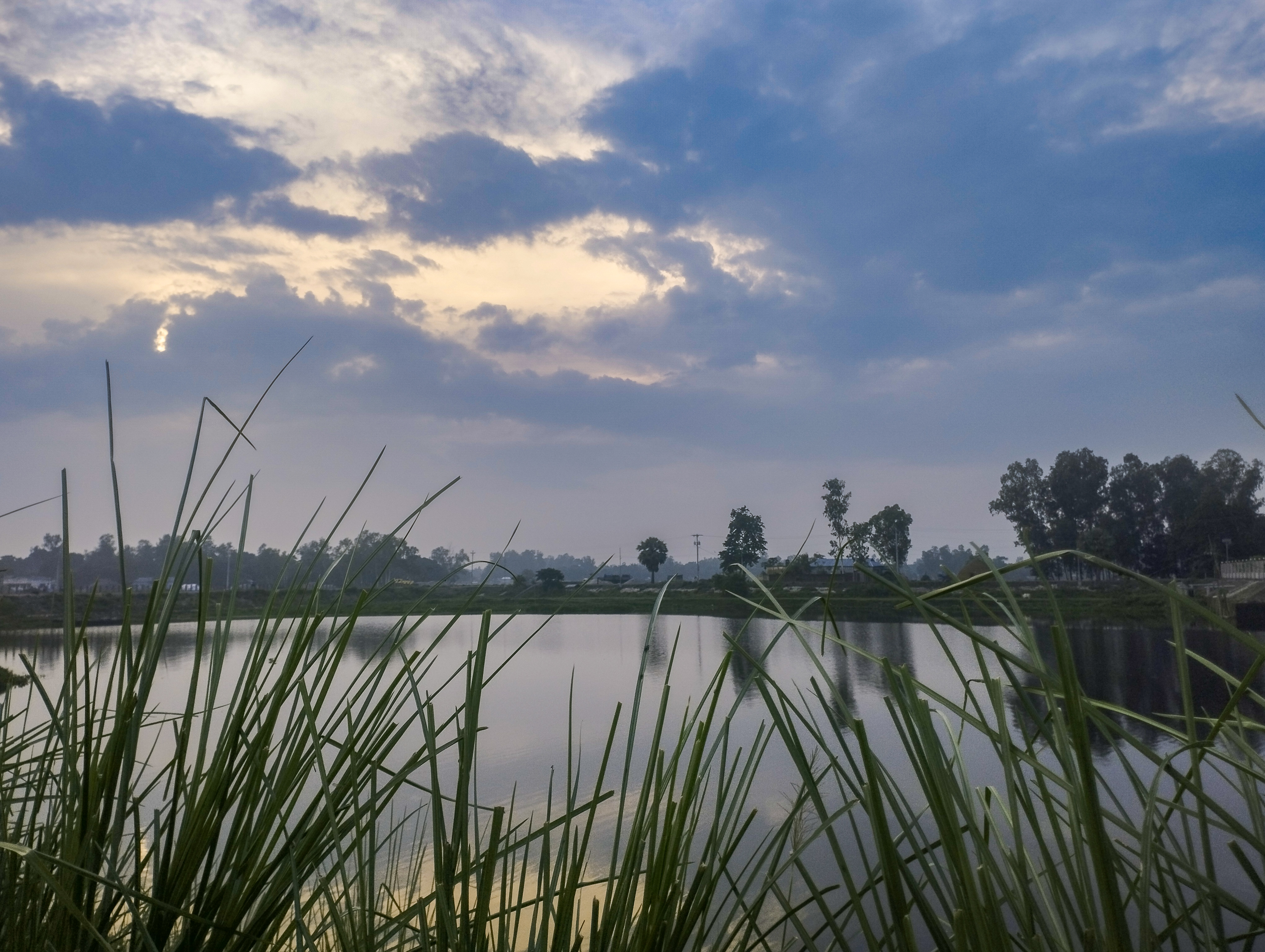
Khorka Beel at the late afternoon

== Environmental conditions and problems ==
Khorka Beel is currently facing various environmental problems. A part of the beel is being filled up to build a shelter project. Locals fear that the entire beel will gradually disappear due to this filling. In 1993, 40 percent of the land class of seven acres of the beel was changed and currently work on the shelter project is underway there. Some parts of the beel have also been filled up to build a new building for the Upazila Parishad.

Its biodiversity suffers as a result of beel filling. Consequently, the habitat of numerous fish and aquatic animal species is destroyed for the lake's water pollution. This can cause long-term environmental and economic damage.

== Conservation and development efforts ==
Locals have urged the government to preserve the Khorka Beel. It is planned to renovate it and build it on the model of Hatirjheel, preserving the heritage of the beel. According to the Upazila Local Government Engineering Department office, the construction cost of the 260-meter-long bridge including the viaduct was allocated 230 million 5.1 million 84 thousand taka.

The construction of the bridge has improved the accessibility of the beel and increased the tourism potential. But it is very important to consider whether the construction of bridges and the creation of tourist centers have a negative impact on the ecosystem.

== See also ==
- Beel
