= Madarganj Abdul Ali Mirza Kasem Kamil Madrasah =

Famous educational institute in Jamalpur in Bangladesh

- Emblem of Madarganj Abdul Ali Mirza Kasem Kamil Madrasah
- Former names: 1. Madarganj Abdul Ali Senior Madrasah; 2. Madarganj Abdul Ali Mirza Kasem Fazil Madrasah
- Type: MPO affiliated
- Established: January 1, 1967; 59 years ago
- Founder: Mawlana Abdul Ali
- Academic affiliations: Islamic University, Kushtia (From the begin - 2016); Islamic Arabic University (2016- present)
- Secondary Affiliation: Bangladesh Madrasah Education Board
- Students: 1000 approx
- Location: Balijuri Bazar, Madarganj Upazila, Jamalpur, 2041, Bangladesh; 24.903532°N 89.715864°E
- Campus: Urban
- EIIN: 110049
- MPO Number: 3704042302
- Website: maamkkm.edu.bd

Madarganj Abdul Ali Mirza Kasem Kamil Madrasah (Bengali: মাদারগঞ্জ আব্দুল আলী মির্জা কাসেম কামিল মাদরাসা) is a traditional educational institution located in Madarganj Upazila of Jamalpur District, Bangladesh. It was established with the aim of providing advanced education to students by combining religious and general education. The madrasah has been playing an important role in fulfilling the religious and social needs of the local people. The madrasah serves as the examination center for the public examinations of madrasas in Madarganj Upazila.

== History ==
The madrasa was established by Mawlana Abdul Ali in 1967 AD. The institute was approved by the Government of Bangladesh on 1 January 1977. From the beginning, the madrasah quickly gained fame and was converted into a Fazil (degree) madrasah. Later, in 2023, it received approval for Kamil (postgraduate).

== Educational activities ==
Madarganj Abdul Ali Mirza Kasem Kamil Madrasah has primary education from Ebtedayee to the highest level of Kamil (postgraduate) class. Apart from this, there are science and humanities branches at both the Dakhil (secondary) and Alim (higher secondary) levels of this madrasah. The students of this madrasah participate in various competitions related to studies and sports.

The madrasah was awarded the best educational institution at the district level (madrasa category) in the National Education Week-2024.

== Library and laboratory ==
There is a library in the madrasah for all the students of the madrasah to gain knowledge. Where books on Quran, Hadith and Fiqh are collected along with books on history and literature. Students can borrow books from here according to the rules.

And for the students of science subjects, there are chemistry and physics laboratories. There is also a 40-seat computer lab for computer training.

== See also ==
- Madrasah
- Bangladesh Madrasah Education Board
- Madarganj Upazila
