= Mahmudul Hasan Sohag =

Bangladeshi entrepreneur

- মাহমুদুল হাসান সোহাগ
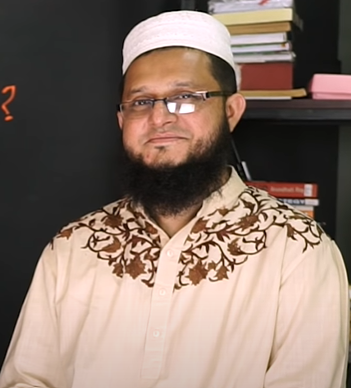
- Sohag in 2019
- Born: 7 June 1981 (age 45); Sarishabari, Jamalpur, Bangladesh
- Other name: Sohag Bhai
- Education: Dhaka College; BUET Bangladesh University of Engineering and Technology
- Occupation: Entrepreneur
- Known for: Rokomari.com, Udvash

Mahmudul Hasan Sohag (Bengali: মাহমুদুল হাসান সোহাগ; born 7 June 1981) is a Bangladeshi entrepreneur. He is the Chairman and Co-Founder of Rokomari.com, which initially started as an online bookstore. He also founded Udvash Coaching Center and OnnoRokom Web Service Limited. He developed the first Electronic Voting Machine (EVM) in Bangladesh. He was also the Academic Councilor of Bangladesh Mathematical Olympiad. He is the chairman of OnnoRokom Group.

== Early life ==
Sohag was born on 7 June 1981, in a village of Sarishabari Upazila of Jamalpur District. His father is Abul Hossain who is a school teacher and mother is Monowara Begum. Hossain was an officer of the postal department. Sohag is the youngest child of parents, two daughters and one son.

== Education ==
Sohag completed his primary education at Naseeruddin Kindergarten, a local children's school. Then he passed SSC from Riazuddin Talukder High School in 1998. After that he got admission in higher secondary in Dhaka College. Later he got admission to the Bangladesh University of Engineering and Technology in the Department of Electrical and Electronic Engineering. Before passing he worked for some time as a research assistant in BUET's Institute of Information and Communication Technology.

== Personal life ==
In a 2021 interview with BBC Bangla, Sohag discussed his transition from atheism to Islam.

== Career ==
After working as a research assistant at Bangladesh University of Engineering and Technology (BUET) He was selected as the Bangladesh representative to participate in the Entrepreneur Exchange Program organized by the University of Oklahoma, USA in 2012.

=== Rokomari.com ===
Rokomari.com is an online product shopping website in Bangladesh. It was officially launched on 19 January 2012. Currently, various products including DVDs, video tutorials, sporting goods, other types of science boxes, calculators, watches, pen drives, various computer parts are also available on this site, but the site is mainly focused on selling books online in Bangladesh

=== Construction of EVMs ===
It was started in 2007 with funding from Officers Club, Dhaka. In 2009, BUET contracted with Sohag's company Pi Labs Bangladesh to build EVMs and helped to build it. Their EVMs have been used in Bangladesh elections, including the 2015 Dhaka South City Corporation election. Pi Labs Bangladesh Company has also invented Easy OMR Solution software.

=== OnnoRokom Group ===
OnnoRokom Group is the parent organization of various organizations. Various projects and initiatives have been taken under the OnnoRokom Group. Rokomari.com is a part of the OnnoRokom Web Service. Among these initiatives are:

- Pi Labs Bangladesh Limited: This service includes Electronic Voting Machine (EVM), Solar inverter, Solar Charge Controller, Industry Automation, Vehicle Tracking System and many more.
- OnnoRokom Software Limited
- OnnoRokom Projukti Limited
- OnnoRokom Electronics Company Limited
- OnnoRokom Solutions: Import-Export
- OnnoRokom Web Service Limited
- OnnoRokom Publications Limited
- OnnoRokom Science Box
- OnnoRokom Pathshala
- Onnorokom EdTech Limited
- Wester International School
- Techshop Bangladesh Limited

In addition, OnnoRokom Group has established a laboratory called the OnnoRokom Bioinformatics Laboratory in the Department of Genetic Engineering, University of Dhaka.

=== Udvash-Unmesh-Uttoron ===
Udvash is one of the largest shadow education platforms in Bangladesh, with 137 branches nationwide. It was launched in December 2000 in Dhaka, and primarily focuses on the science stream on academic and admission exam studies.
