= Chief of Defence Staff (Bangladesh) =

Bangladesh Armed Forces position

Chief of Defence Staff of Bangladesh Armed Forces
- Type: Chief of defence
- Status: Retired
- Abbreviation: CDS
- Reports to: President of Bangladesh
- Appointer: President of Bangladesh
- Formation: 24 August 1975
- First holder: Major General Khalilur Rahman

Chief of Defense Staff (CDS) is a retired Bangladesh Armed Forces position. The CDS was above the three service chiefs and reported directly to the President. It was created by Khondaker Mostaq Ahmed and held by Khalilur Rahman.

== History ==
After the assassination of Sheikh Mujib, Khondaker Mostaq Ahmed took power as the new President. In order to secure the military, Ahmed shuffled the ranks. Major General Khalilur Rahman, who had been the DG of the Bangladesh Rifles, was promoted to the role of Chief of Defense Staff. This helped reduce the influence of the new army chief, Major General Ziaur Rahman. Khalilur would hold the post for three months until Zia took power in the 7 November coup.

== See also ==
- Chief of Army Staff (Bangladesh)
- Deputy Chief of Army Staff (Bangladesh)
