= Syed Abdus Sobhan =

Bangladeshi politician

Member of Bangladesh Parliament
- In office 1979–1986
- Preceded by: Constituency established
- Succeeded by: Constituency boundaries changed

Personal details
- Born: 1932 Sherpur, Mymensingh district, Bengal Province
- Died: 5 July 2000 (aged 67) Bangladesh
- Resting place: Beltia Graveyard, Jamalpur District, Bangladesh
- Party: Bangladesh Nationalist Party
- Other political affiliations: BAKSAL

Syed Abdus Sobhan (Bengali: সৈয়দ আব্দুস সোবহান; 12 December 1932 – 5 July 2000) is a Bangladeshi lawyer and politician. He participated in the Bangladesh Liberation War and served as a member of parliament for Jamalpur-5.

== Early life and education ==
Abdus Sobhan was born on 12 December 1932 in his maternal home, the Sheri Miah Bari of Sherpur. His elder brother Syed Abdus Sattar influenced him to get into politics. He was arrested in class 8 for participating in the Bengali language movement along with his brother, expelled from school and tortured in prison. He was later released.

Abdus Sobhan was elected as the general secretary of the Asheq Mahmud College Students' Union in 1952. He holds a Bachelor of Laws degree.

== Career ==
In 1964, Syed Abdus Sobhan was appointed as the commissioner of Jamalpur municipality. He was later elected to the East Bengal Legislative Assembly from Jamalpur. Abdus Sobhan was involved in the six point movement and the Bangladesh Liberation War.

Following independence, Abdus Sobhan joined the Bangladesh Nationalist Party in 1972. He was elected to the Jatiya Sangsad in 1973. He subsequently joined the Bangladesh Nationalist Party and went into hiding following the assassination of Sheikh Mujibur Rahman. He was arrested on 4 March 1976. Abdus Sobhan was re-elected to parliament from Jamalpur-5 in 1979.

== Personal life ==
Abdus Sobhan was married, and had five daughters and one son.

== Death and legacy ==
In 1986, he had a brain stroke and eventually retired. Abdus Sobhan died on 5 July 2000 at a renal care centre. His body was taken to Jamalpur where his janaza was conducted and he was buried in the Beltia family graveyard.

He was posthumously awarded by the Jamalpur District in 2012 for his contributions during the Bengali language movement.
