= Deputy Chief of Army Staff (Bangladesh) =

Military ranks of Bangladesh

Deputy Chief of Army Staff of Bangladesh Army
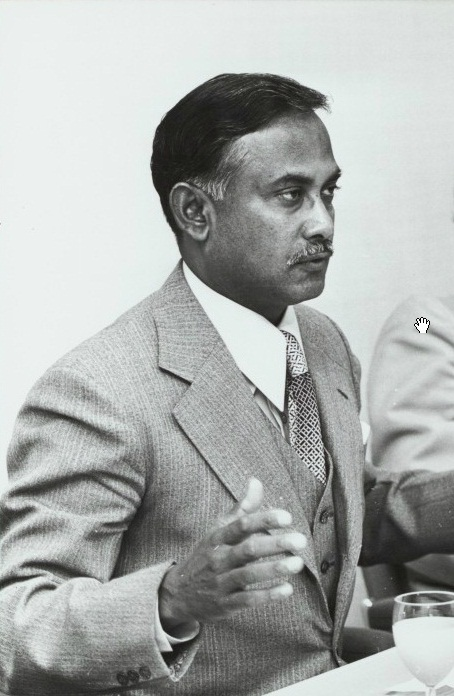
- First DCOAS
- Type: Second-in-Command of Bangladesh Army
- Status: Retired
- Abbreviation: DCOAS
- Reports to: Chief of the Army Staff
- Term length: 3 years
- Inaugural holder: Ziaur Rahman
- Final holder: Hussain Muhammad Ershad
- Unofficial names: Deputy army chief

Deputy Chief of Army Staff (DCOAS) was a military rank used by the Bangladesh Army. The DCOAS was second-in-command to the Chief of Army Staff (COAS) and above the Chief of General Staff (CGS). The post was later retired and the CGS became the second-in-command of the army chief. It initially had the same two-star rank as both Shafiullah and Zia were promoted to Major General.

== History ==
According to Major General KM Shafiullah, the post was created because then-Major General Ziaur Rahman was aggreived at being passed over for the role of chief of army staff (COAS). After the assassination of Sheikh Mujib, Zia was made army chief and HM Ershad became his deputy.

== List of Deputy Army Chiefs of Staff ==
No.	Name	Term start	Term end	Unit of Commission
1	Major General Ziaur Rahman	6 April 1972	25 August 1975	Punjab Regiment
2	Major General Hussain Muhammad Ershad	24 August 1975	28 April 1978	East Bengal Regiment
3	Major General Atiqur Rahman	28 April 1978	31 August 1986	Artillery Regiment

== See also ==
- Chief of Defence Staff (Bangladesh)
- Chief of Army Staff (COAS)
