= Md. Mamunoor Rashid =

Bangladeshi politician

Member of Parliament

Personal details
- Party: Jatiya Party

Md. Mamunoor Rashid is a Jatiya Party politician and a former member of parliament for Jamalpur-4.

== Early life ==
Rashid was born on 31 December 1968. He has a younger brother, Enamul Haque Joarder. Rashid has an Alim degree.

== Career ==
Rashid was elected to parliament from Jamalpur-4 as a Jatiya Party candidate on 5 January 2014.
