= Rokomari.com =

Online bookstore from Bangladesh

- Logo

- Screenshot
- Website type: E-commerce
- Available in: Bangla, English
- Owner: Onnorokom Group
- Founders: Mahmudul Hasan Sohag; Abul Hasan Liton; Khairul Anam Ronnie; Ahteshamul Shams Rakib; Jubair Bin Amin
- Key people: Khairul Anam Ronnie (CEO)
- Website: Rokomari.com
- Launched: 19 January 2012

Rokomari.com (Bengali: রকমারি.কম) is a Bangladeshi e-commerce site. It officially launched on 19 January 2012. Initially, the website sold only physical books, but now sells ebooks and a variety of items from sporting goods to Stationery.

Rokomari.com operates as a marketplace and works with publishers who sell their books on this platform, but does not publish any of the books it sells. Apart from books published in Bangladesh, it also sells foreign books, including several from West Bengal. Rokomari.com primarily sells books written in Bengali and English, however it also sells other foreign language books.

== History ==
Rokomari.com was founded on 19 January 2012, by Mahmudul Hasan Sohag, Abul Hasan Liton, Khairul Anam Ronnie, Ahteshamul Shams Rakib, and Jubair Bin Amin, At this point the website only sold around 100 books. Since then the website has grown, selling 1,100,000 books in 2019.

== Services for authors and publishers ==
Rokomari assists publishers on digital marketing services and provides data on their books. Rokomari hosts a number of online and offline events in collaboration with authors.

== Rokomari Best Seller Award ==
Every year, Rokomari gives the Bestseller Award to the top 7 books and authors in each of the following categories on the final date of its leaderboard: Fiction, Non-fiction, Religious, and Career & Academic. In total, 28 bestselling authors (7 from each of the 4 main categories) and 28 publishing houses of those bestselling books receive the “Rokomari Online Book Fair Bestseller Award 2025.”

== Controversy ==
In March 2014, following death threats issued by Islamic militants against Avijit Roy, a US-Bangladeshi blogger, author, and critic of religious extremism, Rokomari discontinued the sale of his books, including Bigyaner Janala and Hujur, without any government proscription. Roy criticized this decision, characterizing it as an endorsement of militancy and a capitulation to extremist intimidation.

=== Book sale policy ===
Rokomari.com's policy states it will not to sell books that are illegal, banned by the Government of Bangladesh, attack or hurt the sentiment of Bangladesh Liberation War or the interest of the state of Bangladesh, hurt religious or group sentiment. If the subject of a book violates laws or hurts religious sentiment or an author is found involved in illegal activities, Rokomari.com removes and stops selling that book or books of that author immediately. In the past, it has taken measures against several authors after receiving complaints against them.
