= Abdur Rashid (Jamalpur politician) =

Bangladeshi politician

Member of the Bangladesh Parliament for Jamalpur-4
- In office 30 January 2024 – 6 August 2024
- Preceded by: Murad Hasan

Personal details
- Born: 12 April 1957 (age 68)
- Party: Bangladesh Awami League

Abdur Rashid (born 12 April 1957) is a Bangladesh Awami League politician and a former Jatiya Sangsad member representing the Jamalpur-4 constituency served in 2024.
