= Rezaul Karim Hira =

Bangladeshi politician

- রেজাউল করিম হীরা

Member of Parliament for Jamalpur-5
- In office 14 July 1996 – January 2019
- Preceded by: Sirajul Haq
- Succeeded by: Mozaffar Hossain

Personal details
- Born: 1 December 1942 (age 82) Jamalpur District, Bengal Presidency, British India
- Political party: Bangladesh Awami League

Rezaul Karim Hira (born 1 December 1942) is a Bangladesh Awami League politician who served as the Jatiya Sangsad member representing the Jamalpur-5 constituency during 1996-2018 and is chairman of the Parliamentary Standing Committee on the Ministry of Land. He was the minister for land in Sheikh Hasina's cabinet from 2009 to 2013.
