= Shah Newaz =

Bangladeshi politician

Member of Bangladesh Parliament
- In office 1986–1988

Personal details
- Party: Communist Party of Bangladesh

Shah Newaz is a Communist Party of Bangladesh politician and a former member of parliament for Jamalpur-4.

== Career ==
Newaz was elected to parliament from Jamalpur-4 as a Communist Party of Bangladesh candidate in 1986.
