= Abul Hossain (Jamalpur politician) =

Bangladeshi politician

Member of Bangladesh Parliament
- In office February 1996 – June 2001
- Preceded by: Mirza Azam
- Succeeded by: Mirza Azam

Personal details
- Party: Bangladesh Nationalist Party

Abul Hossain is a Bangladesh Nationalist Party politician and a former member of parliament for Jamalpur-3.

== Career ==
Hossain was elected to parliament from Jamalpur-3 as a Bangladesh Nationalist Party candidate in February 1996.
