= Abul Kalam Azad (Jamalpur-5 MP) =

Bangladeshi politician

Abul Kalan Azad
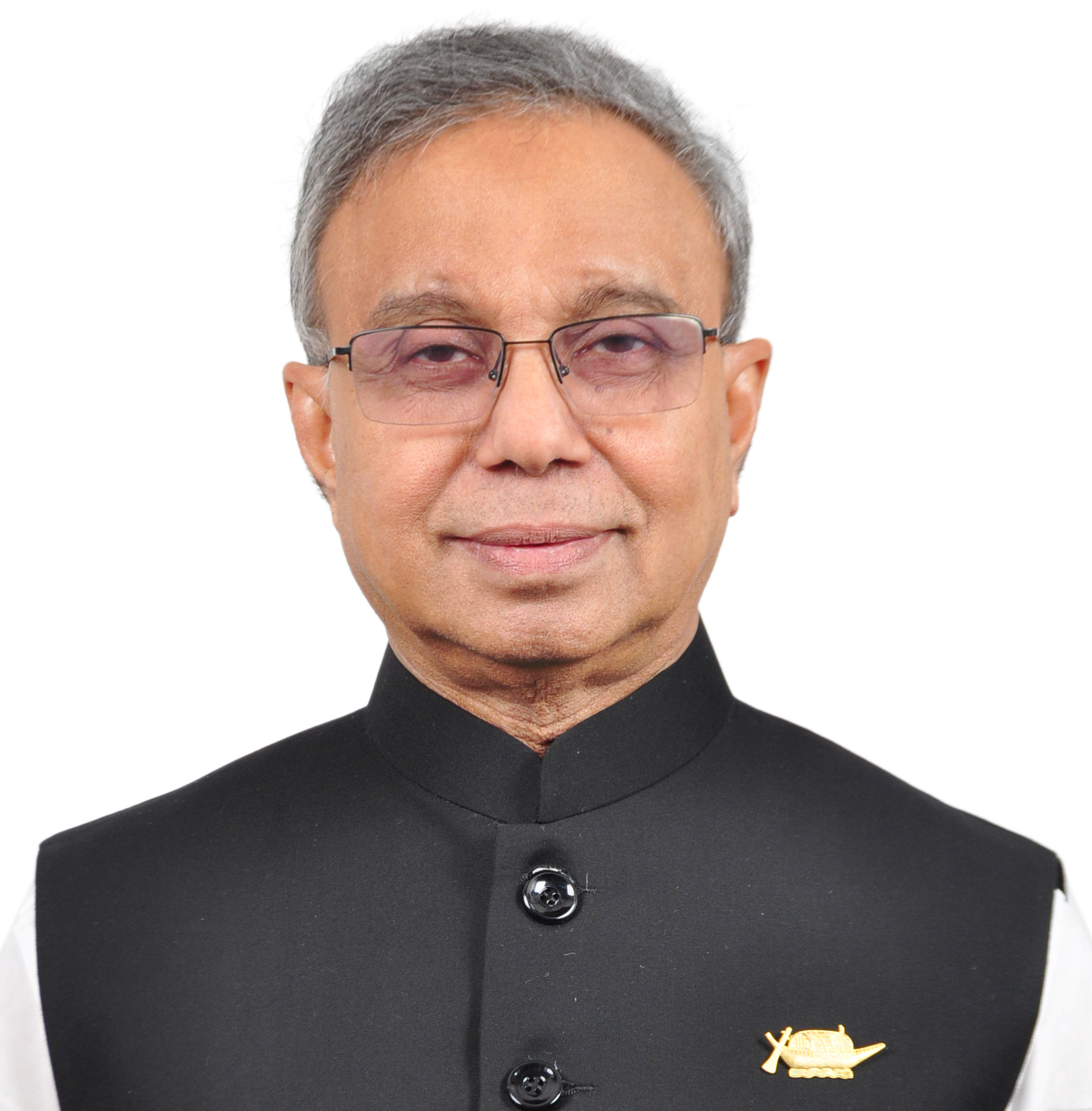

Member of the Bangladesh Parliament for Jamalpur-5
- In office 30 January 2024 – 6 August 2024
- Preceded by: Mozaffar Hossain

Principal Secretary to the Prime Minister
- In office 16 February 2016 – 1 December 2016
- Preceded by: Abdus Sobhan Sikder
- Succeeded by: Kamal Chowdhury

Personal details
- Born: 7 January 1957 (age 69) Jamalpur, East Pakistan, Pakistan

Abul Kalan Azad is a retired Bangladesh Civil Service officer, and politician.

== Career ==
Azad served as a Jatiya Sangsad member representing the Jamalpur-5 constituency as a candidate of Bangladesh Awami League in 2024. He has previously served as Principal Secretary to the Prime Minister, Economic Relations Division, Power Division and Secretary to the PMO.

Azad was arrested after the fall of the Sheikh Hasina led Awami League government.

== Political career ==
On 26 November 2023, Abul Kalam Azad was nominated by the Awami League as its candidate for the Jamalpur-5 constituency in the 12th National Parliamentary Election. In 2024, he lost his parliamentary seat following the dissolution of the National Parliament through the non-cooperation movement.
