= Shafiqul Islam Khoka =

Bangladeshi politician

Member of Bangladesh Parliament

Personal details
- Died: 15 September 2017 Dhaka, Bangladesh
- Party: Bangladesh Krishak Sramik Awami League

Shafiqul Islam Khoka was a Bangladesh Krishak Sramik Awami League politician and a former member of parliament for Jamalpur-3.

== Career ==
Khoka was elected to parliament from Jamalpur-3 as a Bangladesh Krishak Sramik Awami League candidate in 1986 and 1988.

== Death ==
Khoka died on 15 September 2017 in United Hospital, Dhaka.
