= Jamalpur, Bangladesh =

City in Jamalpur District, Mymensingh Division

Jamalpur জামালপুর
- City and Municipality
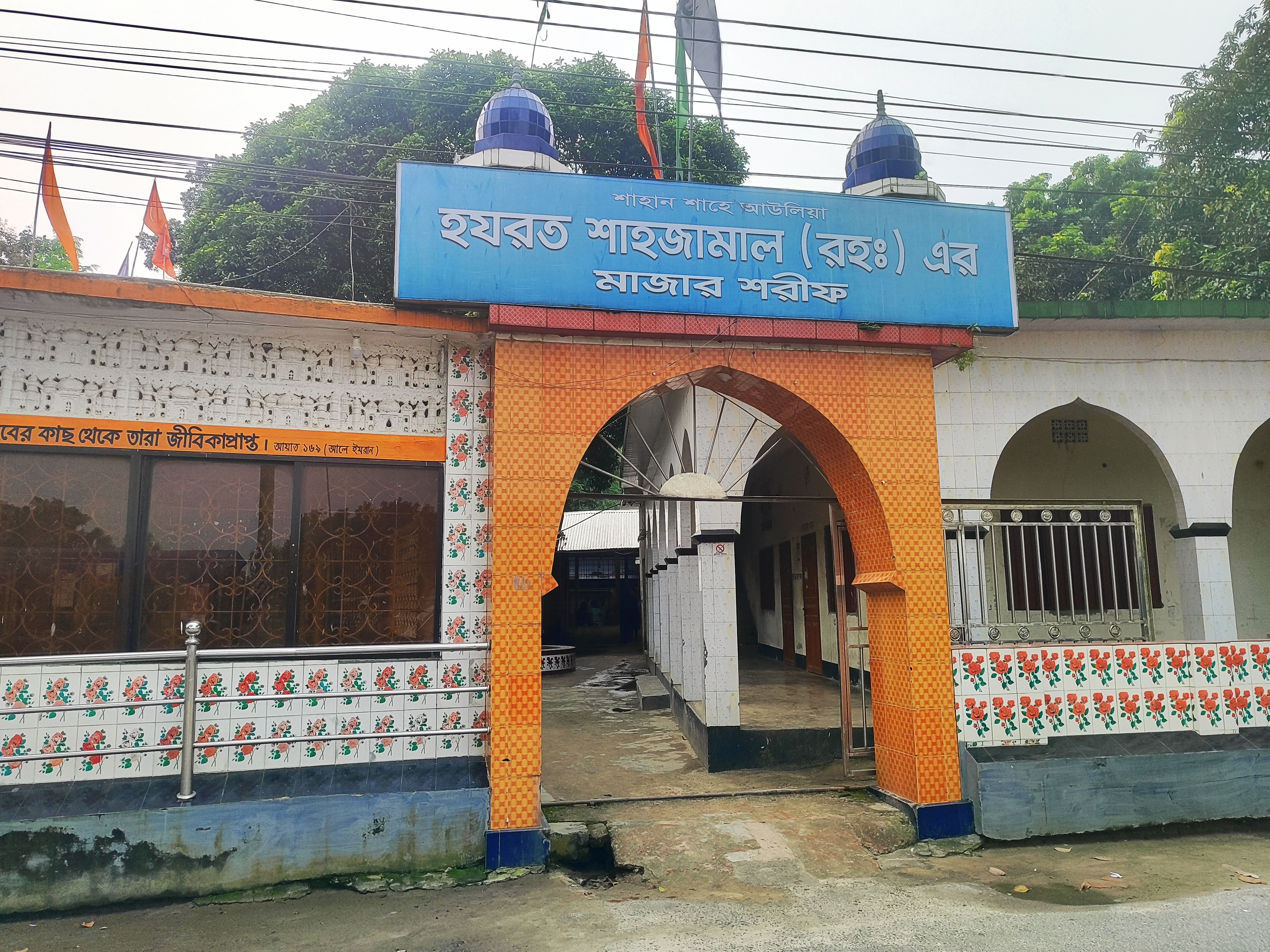
- Shrine of Shah Jamal, Jamalpur

- Location within Mymensingh division Location within Bangladesh
- Coordinates: 24.925°N 89.943°E
- Country: Bangladesh
- Division: Mymensingh
- District: Jamalpur
- Upazila: Jamalpur Sadar

Government
  - Type: Mayor–Council
  - Body: Jamalpur Municipal Corporation

Area
  - Total: 55.2 km^{2} (21.3 sq mi)

Population
  - Total: 158,873
  - Density: 2,880/km^{2} (7,450/sq mi)
- Time zone: UTC+6 (Bangladesh Time)
- National Dialing Code: +880

Jamalpur (Bengali: জামালপুর) is a city on the bank of the Old Brahmaputra river in the Mymensingh Division. It is the headquarters of the Jamalpur District and the Jamalpur Sadar Upazila. According to the 2022 Bangladeshi census, the population of Jamalpur is 158,889, which makes it the 31st largest city in Bangladesh by population.

== Etymology ==
The previous name of Jamalpur was Shinghojani. It was renamed for Hazrat Shah Jamal, who came from Yemen during the time of Akbar to spread Islam in the region, and whose shrine remains in the city.

The -pur suffix functions similar to western -burg, or -hrad, roughly meaning "town." It's a variant of the Sanskrit -pura, originally meaning a fortified earthen enclosure or a citadel used for refuge during battles or floods. It, along with other local variants, is commonly used across South Asia, as well as in surrounding regions.

== Demographics ==
Religions in Jamalpur Paurashava (2022)
Religion	Percent
Islam	97.14%
Hinduism	2.79%
Other or not stated	0.07%

According to the 2022 Bangladesh census, Jamalpur city had 39,845 households and a population of 158,889. Jamalpur had a literacy rate of 80.10%: 82.88% for males and 77.39% for females, and a sex ratio of 97.93 males per 100 females. 8.33% of the population was under 5 years of age.

As of 2011 Jamalpur Paurashava had 33,845 households and a population of 142,764. 28,743 (20.13%) were under 10 years of age. Jamalpur has a literacy rate of 62.14% and a sex ratio of 999 females per 1000 males.
