= Sirajul Haq (Bangladeshi politician) =

Bangladeshi politician

Deputy Minister - Ministry of Health
- In office 1991 – February 1996

Jamalpur-5 constituency Member of Parliament
- In office 1991 – June 1996

Personal details
- Born: Jamalpur District
- Party: Bangladesh Nationalist Party

Sirajul Haq is politician of Bangladesh Nationalist Party, veteran of the Mukti Bahini, former member of parliament for the Jamalpur-5 constituency and former deputy minister of health.

== Early life ==
Haq was born in Jamalpur District.

== Career ==
Haq was elected member of parliament for the Jamalpur-5 constituency on the nomination of Bangladesh Nationalist Party in the 5th parliamentary election (1991) and 6th parliamentary election (February 1996). In the First Khaleda Cabinet, he served as deputy minister of health.

Haq was defeated in the seventh parliamentary elections (June 1996), the eighth parliamentary elections (2001) and the ninth parliamentary elections (2008) with the nomination of BNP from the same constituency.

== See also ==
- List of members of the 5th Jatiya Sangsad
- List of members of the 6th Jatiya Sangsad
