= Madarganj Upazila =

Upazila in Jamalpur Zilla, Mymensingh Division (Formerly Dhaka Division), Bangladesh

Madarganj মাদারগঞ্জ
- Upazila
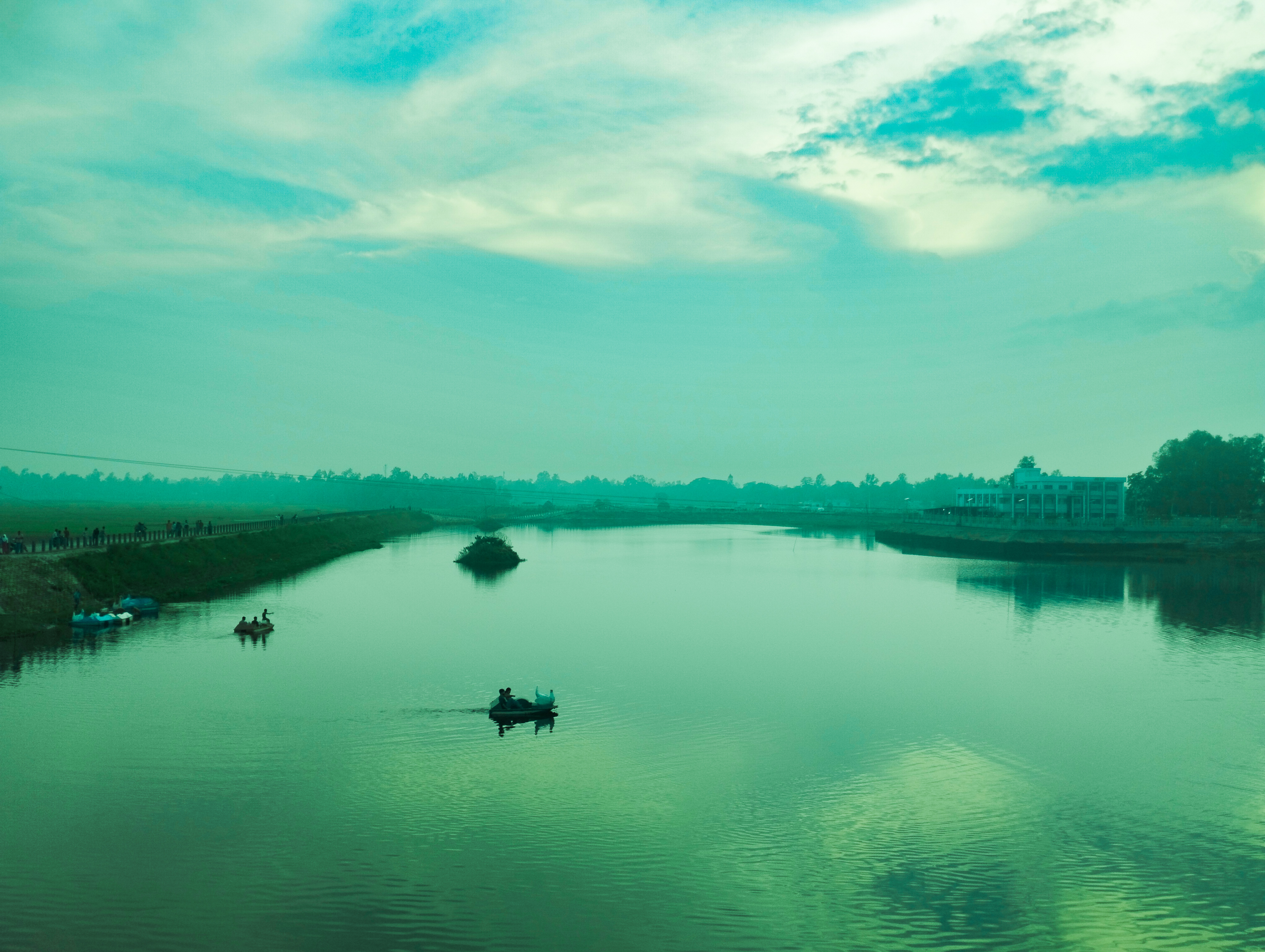
- Khorka Beel

- Coordinates: 24°53.5′N 89°45′E
- Country: Bangladesh
- Division: Mymensingh Division
- District: Jamalpur District

Government
  - MP: Mostafizur Rahman Babul

Area
  - Upazila: 225.39 km^{2} (87.02 sq mi)
  - Metro: 10.788 km^{2} (4.165 sq mi)
- Elevation: 18 m (59 ft)

Population (2022)
  - Upazila: 285,999
  - Density: 1,268.9/km^{2} (3,286.5/sq mi)
- Time zone: UTC+6 (BST)
- Postal code: 2040
- Website: madarganj.jamalpur.gov.bd

Madarganj Upazila mauza geocode map

Madarganj (Bengali: মাদারগঞ্জ) is an Upazila in Jamalpur District, in the Division of Mymensingh, Bangladesh.The area is known for its rich cultural heritage, natural beauty, and agricultural productivity.

== Geography and climate ==
Madarganj Upazila is located on the east bank of the Jamuna River, 34 km west of the Jamalpur district headquarters. Madarganj Upazila is situated between 24°47' to 24°59' north latitude and 89°40' to 89°50' east longitude, covering an area of 225.39 square kilometers. The upazila is bordered by Islampur upazila to the north, Melandaha and Jamalpur Sadar upazilas to the east, Sarishabari upazila to the south, and Shariakandi Upazila of Bogura district of Rajshahi division to the west.

The soil in the upazila is primarily sand-loam and atel-loam. The land is fertile and silty, but the region experiences floods almost every year, resulting in significant crop damage. The area receives a significant amount of rainfall due to the influence of monsoons, and there is heavy fog during the winter months. Summer temperatures range from 30 to 37 °C. The average annual rainfall is 853 cm. The total agricultural land area is 60062 acres, with 42877 acres being arable land

== History ==
In 1760, when the entire Bengali population was suffering under British Raj and widespread chaos engulfed the political arena, the Bengali throne was controlled by The British Ruler, at this very time, the Sannyasis (ascetics) started a rebellion which initiated the Great Bengal famine aka 'Chhiattar Manbantar.' At such a time, the Fakirs (Sufi ascetics) left their spiritual practices to protect the people of Bengal from the English. Their main camp was in Makhnopur, Gorakhpur district of Nepal. They came to this land and established their camps at Mahasthangarh in Bogura and the remote island of Daokoba in the Mymensingh district. The Daokoba River was a branch of the Brahmaputra. Today, it's known as the Jamuna River. At that time, the present-day flowing Jamuna River did not exist. In 1778, English surveyor Mr. Renel created a map where the name 'Jamuna' was absent, but the names of the Brahmaputra and the Daokoba River were present. The Fakirs started their secret activities in this remote island. At that time, a person named Shah Madar, a preacher, joined their group. He came to this country from Syria to preach religion. His full name was Seyyad Badruddin Kuthub-ur-Madar Shah. Shah Madar directly participated in the Fakir movement alongside Majnu Shah, the leader of the rebellion. Around 1763, after Shah Madar arrived at this remote island, the Fakirs accepted him as their disciple, and they became known as the Madariya community. In 1772, during the rainy season, the Fakirs and ascetics created extensive unrest and riots in various villages of Bogura and Mymensingh districts, looting the belongings of farmers, creating a terrifying situation in the country. When the ascetic rebellion was somewhat subdued, in 1815, the then Magistrate of Mymensingh district, Mr. Year, appointed 13 watchmen to enforce law and government orders in Madarganj area. After the establishment of Jamalpur district in 1845, a police outpost was set up in Madarganj in 1882. After 24 years of the outpost's establishment, on June 15, 1906, in the Eastern Bengal Gazette, Madarganj Police Outpost was converted into a full-fledged police station. Since then, Madarganj has been the name of a police station. Currently, it is the name of the upazila.

== Administration ==
Madarganj Upazila is divided into Madarganj Municipality and seven union parishads: Adarvita, Balijuri, Char Pakerdah, Gunaritala, Jorekhali, Karaichara, and Sidhuli. The union parishads are subdivided into 101 mauzas and 119 villages.

Every five years, the Upazila and Union Parisad elect representatives (commissionaire) and chairman for Municipality and 7 union Councils.

== Demographics ==
Historical population
Year	Pop.	±%
1981	219,357	—
1991	268,352	+22.3%
2001	289,337	+7.8%
2011	263,608	−8.9%
2022	285,999	+8.5%
Source: Bangladesh Bureau of Statistics

Religions in Madarganj Upazila (2022)
Religion	Percent
Islam	98.27%
Hinduism	1.72%
Christianity	0.01%
Buddhism	0.002%
Other or not stated	0.0042%

According to the 2022 Bangladeshi census, Madarganj Upazila had 75,592 households and a population of 285,999. 9.36% of the population were under 5 years of age. Madarganj had a literacy rate (age 7 and over) of 58.38%: 61.21% for males and 55.70% for females, and a sex ratio of 95.82 males for 100 females. 50,685 (17.72%) lived in urban areas.

== Agriculture ==
Madarganj is known for its agricultural productivity. The fertile soil and favorable climate make it an ideal place for cultivating various crops. The main crops grown in Madarganj are rice, jute, wheat, sugarcane, and vegetables. According to a report by the Bangladesh Bureau of Statistics, Madarganj produced 45,530 tons of rice in 2020-21, making it one of the top rice-producing areas in the country.

== Education ==
As of 2011, Madarganj Upazila had 66 government primary schools, 94 registered primary schools, 33 kindergartens, 226 NGO schools, 1 government high school, 48 private high schools, 1 school and college, 1 government college, 7 private colleges, 27 madrasas, 2 Qawmi madrasas, 7 Ebtedayee madrasas, and 1 agricultural and veterinary college.

Beyond secondary education, the region offers a diverse set of opportunities for higher learning. This includes a government college, indicating a commitment to tertiary education, alongside four non-government colleges and five vocational colleges, providing avenues for specialized study paths catering to a spectrum of academic interests and career aspirations.

Furthermore, the education system includes 27 madrasas, illustrating the presence of Islamic educational institutions focused on religious and Arabic education. In terms of madrasa education, notable institutions are Balijuri SM Fazil Senior (Degree) Madrasah, Madarganj Abdul Ali Mirza Kasem Kamil Madrasah, Jorkhali Dakhil Madrasah, Milon Bazar Fazil Degree Madrasah, Jonail Nayapara KK Mahmud Dakhil Madrasah, Jonail Raisia Balika Dakhil Madrasah. It is run by the Bangladesh Madrasah Education Board. The other branches of the madrasa are: Jonail Bazar Hafezia Qawmi Madrasah and Orphanage, Darul Quran International Hefaz Madrasah, Darul Ulum Boys Girls Madrasah, etc.

Jamalpur Textile Institute has also been established here for technical education. The institution is located in the north-western part of Jorkhali village in Gunaritala union.

== Culture and Tourism ==
Madarganj has a rich cultural heritage. The area is famous for its traditional folk music, dance, and art. The local people celebrate various festivals throughout the year, such as Eid-ul-Fitr, Eid-ul-Adha, and Durga Puja. Tourists can also enjoy the natural beauty of Madarganj, including the Jamuna River and its surroundings.Khorka Bil is a famous tourist place near the Madarganj city in Gabergram. Dat bhanga bridge and Hawai road are other notable tourist places.

== Transportation ==
Madarganj is well-connected to other parts of the country through various modes of transportation. The roads in Madarganj are well-maintained, and buses and private cars regularly ply on them. The government has also initiated a project to construct a bridge over the Jamuna River, which will further improve the transportation system of the area.

== Healthcare ==
The health sector in Madarganj is robust and diversified, encompassing both public and private healthcare provisions. A centrally located government hospital, equipped with 100 beds, serves as a primary healthcare facility, catering to comprehensive medical needs. Supporting this, four Union Health Centers, an extensive network of 32 community clinics, and a specialized family planning center ensure widespread healthcare accessibility and coverage. Additionally, the presence of five private clinics supplements these public services, offering alternative medical consultations and treatments. This amalgamation of public and private healthcare establishments establishes a comprehensive and multifaceted healthcare system, providing residents with various options and enhancing overall healthcare accessibility within the area.

== Notable place ==
- Khorka Beel (bn:খরকা বিল) is a famous watershed in Madarganj Upazila, Jamalpur District in Bangladesh. The beel has a special feat in the local environment, economy and biodiversity. Over time, it has become known as a haven of natural beauty, as well as facing various environmental challenges. In the past, it was directly connected to the Jamuna River, but today it is separated from the river.
- Jamalpur Textile Institute -A notable textile institute with a beautiful campus located at the north-western side of Jorkhali village in Madarganj Upazila.

== Notable people ==
- Mirza Azam, former Minister of Textiles and Jute
- Nazrul Islam Babu, lyricist
- Md. Abdul Wahhab Miah, acting Chief Justice of Bangladesh
- Karimuzzaman Talukder, politician

== See also ==
- Upazilas of Bangladesh
- Districts of Bangladesh
- Divisions of Bangladesh
