= Abdus Salam Talukder =

Bangladeshi politician

5th General Secretary of Bangladesh Nationalist Party
- In office 1991–1996
- Chairperson: Khaleda Zia
- Preceded by: KM Obaidur Rahman
- Succeeded by: Abdul Mannan Bhuiyan

Minister of Local Government, Rural Development and Co-operatives
- In office 20 March 1991 – January 1996
- Prime Minister: Khaleda Zia
- Succeeded by: Zillur Rahman

Personal details
- Born: 4 November 1936 Jamalpur, Bengal, British India
- Died: 20 August 1999 (aged 62) Dhaka, Bangladesh
- Party: Bangladesh Nationalist Party

Abdus Salam Talukder (4 November 1936 – 20 August 1999) was a Bangladeshi politician and lawyer. He served as the secretary general of Bangladesh Nationalist Party, the State Minister of Law and Parliamentary Affairs, Minister of Local Government and Rural Development and Jatiya Sangsad member from Jamalpur-4 constituency.

== Early life ==
Talukder was born in Mulbari, Sarishabari Upazila, Jamalpur District. He graduated from Sharishabari High School. He completed his bachelor's and master's in political science from the University of Dhaka. He completed his law school in Lincoln's Inn, London and joined the Dhaka bar in 1970.

== Career ==
In 1976, Talukder started in politics by joining the Democratic League. He was elected to the national parliament two times in 1979, and 1991. He was made state minister of Law and Parliamentary Affairs in the cabinet of Ziaur Rahman in 1981. In 1981, he led the Bangladesh delegation to the conference of Afro-Asian Legal Consultative Committee. From 1991 to 1996 he served as the Minister of Local Government, Rural Development and Co-operative in the first Khaleda Zia administration. He lost 1996 parliament election to Maulana Md. Nurul Islam.

Talukder was the chairman of the parliamentary standing committee on local government, cooperative and planning ministry. After losing in the 1996 parliament election, he resigned from secretary general position of Bangladesh Nationalist Party.
