= Mozaffar Hossain (Jamalpur politician) =

Bangladeshi entrepreneur and politician

- মোজাফ্ফর হোসেন

Member of Bangladeshi Parliament

Personal details
- Born: 1 January 1957 (age 69) Jamalpur
- Party: Awami League
- Spouse: Rahima Hossain
- Education: BUTEX
- Occupation: Politician
- Profession: Engineer, businessman

Mozaffar Hossain (Bengali: মোজাফ্ফর হোসেন) is a Bangladeshi engineer, businessman, and politician. He was a member of the Jatiya Sangsad representing Jamalpur.

== Education ==
Hossain was born on 1 January 1957 in Jamalpur. He completed a degree in textile engineering from Textile Engineering College, which is now BUTEX.

== Career ==
Mozaffar Hossain started as a businessman in his early career. He founded a spinning industry after taking the path of entrepreneurship, and soon after made the company a public entity. He was elected to parliament from the Jamalpur-5 seat as a candidate with the Awami League's nomination on 30 December 2018.
