= Jamalpur Sadar Upazila =

Jamalpur Sadar জামালপুর সদর
- Upazila
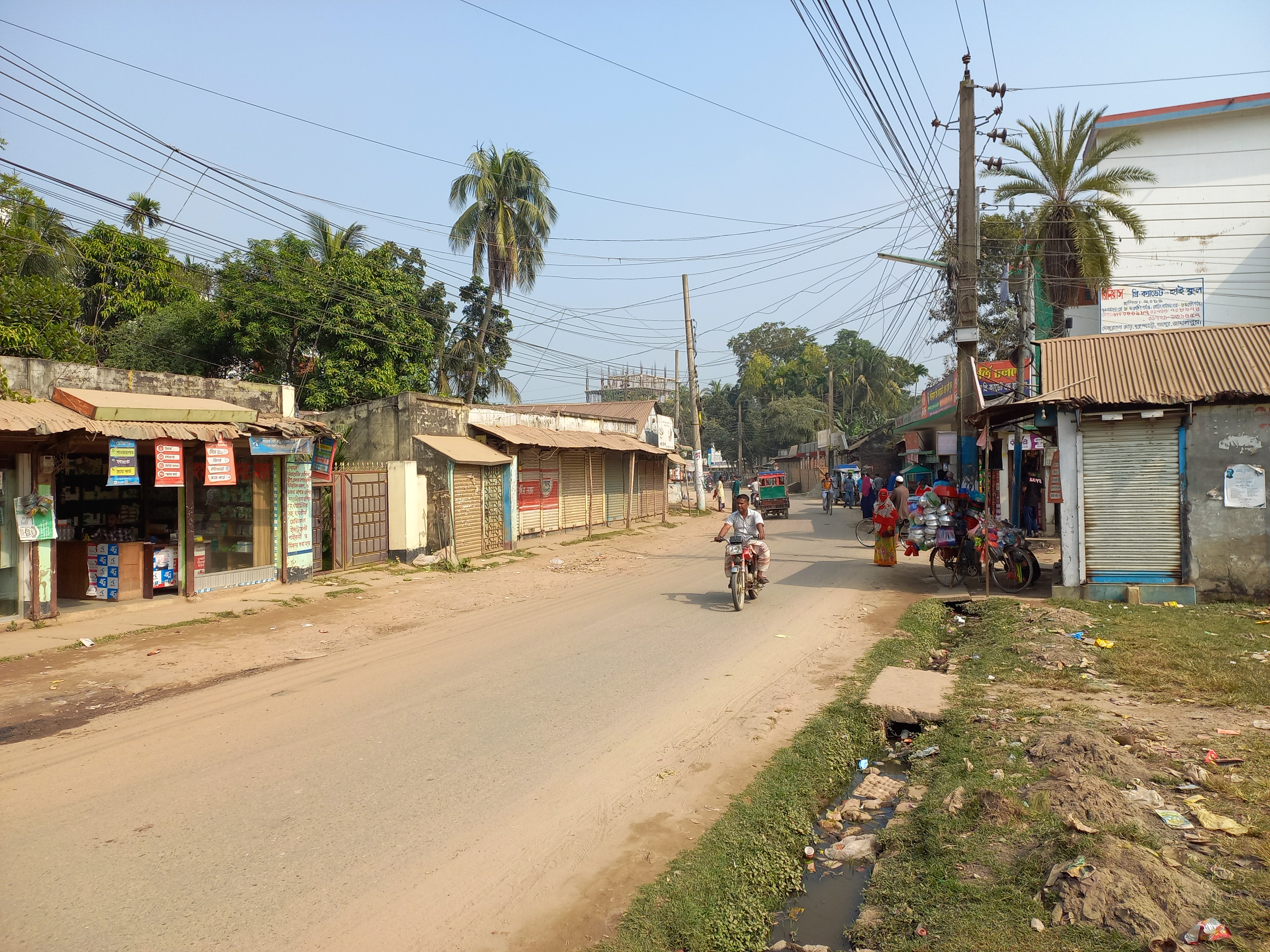
- Street in Jamalpur city

- Coordinates: 24°55′N 89°57.5′E
- Country: Bangladesh
- Division: Mymensingh Division
- District: Jamalpur District
- Headquarters: Jamalpur

Government

Area
  - Total: 508.80 km^{2} (196.45 sq mi)

Population (2022)
  - Total: 668,243
  - Density: 1,313.4/km^{2} (3,401.6/sq mi)
- Time zone: UTC+6 (BST)
- Postal code: 2000
- Area code: 0981
- Website: jamalpursadar.jamalpur.gov.bd

Jamalpur Sadar Upazila mauza geocode map

Jamalpur Sadar (Bengali: জামালপুর সদর) is an upazila of Jamalpur District in Mymensingh, Bangladesh.

== Geography ==
Jamalpur Sadar is located at 24.9167°N 89.9583°E. It has a total area of 508.80 km^{2}. It is bounded by Sherpur district to the north, Mymensingh district to the east, Tangail district of Dhaka division to the south, and Melandaha, Madarganj and Sarishabari upazilas on the west.

== Demographics ==
Historical population
Year	Pop.	±%
1981	416,897	—
1991	501,924	+20.4%
2001	568,726	+13.3%
2011	615,072	+8.1%
2022	668,243	+8.6%
Source: Bangladesh Bureau of Statistics

Religions in Jamalpur Sadar Upazila (2022)
Religion	Percent
Islam	98.27%
Hinduism	1.67%
Other or not stated	0.06%

According to the 2022 Bangladeshi census, Jamalpur Sadar Upazila had 176,033 households and a population of 668,243. 8.97% of the population were under 5 years of age. Jamalpur Sadar had a literacy rate (age 7 and over) of 67.41%: 69.98% for males and 65.06% for females, and a sex ratio of 93.16 males for 100 females. 210,174 (31.45%) lived in urban areas.

== Administration ==
Jamalpur Sadar Upazila is divided into Jamalpur Municipality and 15 union parishads: Banshchara, Digpaith, Ghoradhap, Itail, Kendua, Lakshmir Char, Meshta, Narundi, Ranagachha, Rashidpur, Sahabajpur, Sharifpur, Sreepur, Titpalla, and Tulsir Char. The union parishads are subdivided into 250 mauzas and 365 villages.

Upazila Nirbahi Officer (UNO): Mohammad Abdul Salam

== See also ==
- Upazilas of Bangladesh
- Districts of Bangladesh
- Divisions of Bangladesh
- Narayanganj-Bahadurabad Ghat Line
- Administrative geography of Bangladesh
