= Kazis of Bengal =

Kazi is a family name in Bengal which originates from the Arabic qadi meaning 'judge' and is typically used among Muslims. Kazi (Bengali: কাজী), also spelt Qazi and Quazi, is a title awarded to Islamic judges, commonly used hereditarily in Bengal as a family name.

== Notable individuals ==
=== Given name ===
- Kazi Abdul Baset (1935–2002), painter
- Kazi Abdul Majid (1910-??), former MNA
- Kazi Abdul Odud (1894–1970), Bangladeshi writer
- Kazi Abdur Rashid (1932–2014), politician
- Kazi Abdul Wadud Dara (born 1962), politician
- Kazi Abu Bakar Siddiky Riton (born 1977), director, producer and actor
- Kazi Abul Kasem (1913–2004), Bangladeshi cartoonist and writer
- Kazi Abul Kashem, politician
- Kazi Akbar Uddin Mohammad Siddique (1924–2004), founding member of the Bangladesh Awami League
- Kazi Alauddin, politician
- Kazi Anis Ahmed (born 1970), publisher and businessman
- Kazi Anowar Hossain (1941–2007), painter
- Kazi Anwar Hossain (born 1957), footballer
- Kazi Aref Ahmed (1942–1999), president of Jatiya Samajtantrik Dal
- Kazi Azizul Islam (died 1971), civil servant
- Kazi Bashir, actor
- Kazi Dawa Samdup (1868–1923), Indian translator and writer
- Kazi Firoz Rashid (born 1947), politician
- Kazi Golam Mahbub (1927–2006), Bangladeshi politician
- Kazi Golam Mohiuddin Faroqui (1891–1984), knight and politician
- Kazi Golam Morshed, politician
- Kazi Habibul Awal (born 1956), 13th Chief Election Commissioner of Bangladesh
- Kazi Hasibul Haque (born 1986), cricketer
- Kazi Hayat (born 1947), Bangladeshi film director
- Kazi Jalil Abbasi (1912–1996), Indian politician
- Kazi Jasimuddin Ahmed Joshi (born 1963), cricketer
- Kazi Kader Newaj (1909–1983), Bangladeshi poet
- Kazi Kamrul Islam (born 1987), cricketer
- Kazi Kamruzzaman, paediatric surgeon and social worker
- Kazi Kaniz Sultana (born 1961), politician
- Kazi Keramat Ali (born 1954), former State Minister of Technical Education
- Kazi Khademul Islam (1925–1990), politician and doctor
- Kazi Khaleda Khatun (1939–2013), language activist
- Kazi Khaleed Ashraf (born 1959), architect, urbanist and architectural historian
- Kazi Khalek (1915–1970), actor
- Kazi Lhendup Dorjee (1904–2007), Indian politician
- Kazi Masum Akhtar (born 1971), educator
- Kazi Misbahun Nahar, doctor
- Kazi Mobin-Uddin (1930–1999), American surgeon
- Kazi Mofazzal Hossain Shaikat (born 1986), footballer
- Kazi Mohammed Shafiullah (1934–2025), former Chief of Army Staff
- Kazi Monirul Huda, advocate and politician
- Kazi Monirul Islam Manu (born 1952), politician
- Kazi Morshed (1950–2014), film director
- Kazi Mozammel Haque, politician
- Kazi Muhammad Anowar Hossain (1955–2017), politician
- Kazi Muhammad Badruddoza (1927–2023), scientist
- Kazi Muhammad Ejarul Haque Akhand (born 1971), High Court justice
- Kazi Muhammad Monzur-i-Mowla (1940–2020), author and former director general of Bangla Academy
- Kazi Nabil Ahmed (born 1969), director of Gemcon Group and vice-president of Bangladesh Football Federation
- Kazi Nazrul Islam (1899–1976), Bangladeshi poet
- Kazi Nuruzzaman (1927–2017), politician
- Kazi Nuruzzaman Bir Uttom (1925–2011), lieutenant colonel
- Kazi Rabbi-ul-Hasan, politician
- Kazi Rafiqul Islam, politician
- Kazi Rakibuddin Ahmad (born 1943), former Chief Election Commissioner of Bangladesh
- Kazi Sahabuddin Ahmed, advocate and politician
- Kazi Sahera Anwara Shammi Sheer, politician
- Kazi Salahuddin (born 1953), Bangladeshi football player and manager
- Kazi Sanaul Hoq (born 1961), former chairman of Rupali Bank
- Kazi Sarwar Hossain, rear admiral
- Kazi Sekendar Ali Dalim (1945–2020), politician
- Kazi Shah Mofazzal Hossain Kaikobad (born 1956), politician
- Kazi Shahidun Nabi (1941–2018), 9th Attorney General of Bangladesh
- Kazi Shamsur Rahman (1937–2006), politician
- Kazi Sharif Kaikobad (born 1965), former director general of Bangladesh Ansar and the Village Defence Party
- Kazi Sirajul Islam (born 1940), politician
- Kazi Yunus Ahmed (born 1980), kabaddi player
- Kazi Zafar Ahmed (1939–2015), Bangladeshi politician and Prime Minister
- Kazi Zainul Abedin (1892–1962), Pakistani poet
- Kazi Zaker Husain (1931–2011), zoologist
- Qazi Abdul Alim (1933–2007), athlete and sports organiser
- Qazi Abu Zafar Mohammed Hasan Siddiqui (1940–2012), cultural activist
- Qazi Afsaruddin Ahmed (1921–1975), journalist and writer
- Qazi Azizul Haque (1872–1935), inventor
- Qazi Azizul Mowla, 5th vice-chancellor of Leading University
- Qazi Fazilat (1541–1545), governor of Bengal
- Qazi Fazlur Rahman (1932–2025), former Minister of Irrigation
- Qazi Heyat Mahmud (1693–1760), poet and judge
- Qazi Kholiquzzaman Ahmad (born 1940), thinker and chairman of Dhaka School of Economics
- Qazi Mahabub Ahmed, politician
- Qazi Manzaral Islam Rana (1984–2007), Bangladeshi cricketer
- Qazi Mu'tasim Billah (1933–2013), Islamic scholar and principal of Jamia Shariyyah Malibagh
- Qazi Nur Ahmed Saudagar (1890–1964), politician and lawyer
- Qazi Onik (born 1999), cricketer
- Qazi Ziaur Rashid Rupam (born 1968), cricketer
- Quazi Deen Mohammad, founding director of National Institute of Neurosciences
- Quazi Golam Dastgir (1932–2008), army general and diplomat
- Quazi Mahfujul Haque Supan, member of the Yunus ministry
- Quazi Nurul Hasan Sohan (born 1993), cricketer
- Quazi Reza-Ul Hoque (born 1958), High Court justice
- Quazi Rosy (1949–2022), poet and parliamentarian
- Quazi Saleemul Huq Kamal (born 1951), businessman
- Quazi Sazzad Ali Zahir (born 1951), army officer
- Quazi Sazzad Hossain (born 1968), former vice-chancellor of Khulna University of Engineering & Technology
- Quazi Syque Caesar (born 1990), gymnast and coach
- Quazi Tarikul Islam (born 1954), physician and academic

=== Surname ===
- Abdur Rahim Quazi (born 1968), West Bengal legislator
- Daulat Qazi (1600–1638), poet
- Faruk Quazi (1949–2020), journalist and law reporter
- Kairan Quazi (born 2009), software engineer
- Mizanur Rahman Kazi (born 1976), doctor and MLA
- Zohra Begum Kazi (1912–2007), physician

== Families ==
- Qazi family of Lakhnauti
- Qazi family of Tetulia, Satkhira
- Qazi family of Bagmara, Rajbari
  - Kazi Abdul Wadud (1894–1970), essayist and critic
  - Qazi Motahar Hossain (1897–1981), writer and scientist
  - Qazi Sanjida Khatun (1933–2025), musicologist
  - Qazi Anwar Hussain (1936–2022), novelist
  - Qazi Fahmida Khatun, singer
- Kazi family of Baligaon, Feni
  - Kazi Ebadul Haque (1936–2022), judge
  - Kazi Zinat Hoque (born 1974), High Court justice
- Kazi family of Tungipara, Gopalganj
  - Qazi Abu Yusuf, physician and politician
  - Kazi Zafarullah (born 1947), politician
  - Kazi Shahidullah (1952/53–2025), chairman of University Grants Commission
- Qazi family of Bilbilash, Patuakhali
  - Sher-e-Bangla Qazi Abul Kasem Fazlul Haq (1873–1962), Prime Minister of Bengal
  - Qazi Abul Kalam Faezul Huq (1944–2007), politician and lawyer
- Qazi family of Bhirich Khan, Munshiganj
  - Qazi Azizul Haque (1919–2012), first translator of Sahih al-Bukhari into Bengali
  - Qazi Mahfuzul Haque (born 1969), Islamic scholar
  - Qazi Mamunul Haque (born 1973), Islamic scholar
- Qazi family of Cheora, Comilla
  - Nawab Qazi Musharraf Hussain (1871–1966), lawyer and philanthropist
  - Kazi Zafar Ahmed (1939–2015), Prime Minister of Bangladesh
  - Kazi Zahirul Qayyum, politician
- Kazi family of Churulia, Burdwan
  - Qazi Nazrul Islam (1899–1976), national poet of Bangladesh
  - Kazi Sabyasachi (1928–1979), elocutionist
  - Khilkhil Kazi, singer
- Qazi family of Gadaipur, Khulna
  - Khan Bahadur Qazi Imdadul Haq (1882–1926), writer and educationist
  - Kazi Anwarul Haque (1909–2001), police officer, bureaucrat, and technocrat minister
- Qazi family of Manoharpur, Jhenaidah
  - Qazi Golam Mostofa (1897–1964), writer and poet
  - Qazi Mustafa Monwar (born 1935), painter, sculptor, radio performer and professor
- Qazi family of Mullahbari, Natore
  - Mullah Qazi Muhammad Shamez Uddin Ahmed (1913–1968), Qazi of Natore
  - Qazi Muhammad Shahid Sarwar Azam Shah Jahan (born 1952), retired colonel
  - Sahibzada Qazi Sanwar Azam Sunny (born 1989), environmental activist
- Kazi family of Churulia
- Kazi family of Nilphamari
  - Kazi Abdul Kader (1914–2002), Minister of Agriculture
  - Kazi Faruque Kader, politician
- Kazi family of Rajapur, Faridpur
  - Nawab Kazi Abdul Lateef (1828–1893), aristocrat and educator
  - Kazi Abu Muhammad Abdul Ghafur Nassakh (1834–1889), magistrate and writer
  - Kazi Abul Monsur (1918–1996), microbiologist and physician
  - Kazi Salahuddin (born 1953), president of South Asian Football Federation
  - Kazi Shahidul Alam (born 1955), photojournalist and social activist
- Kazi family of Tarail, Gopalganj
  - Kazi Hayat (born 1947), film director, producer, writer and actor
  - Kazi Maruf (born 1983), film actor

== See also ==
- Qadi
- Khondakar
- Sheikhs of Bengal
- Sayyid
- Mirza
- Shah
- Mir
- Dewan
- Khan
