= Biography of Nazrul =

- Theatrical release poster
- Directed by: Ferdous Khan
- Produced by: Al Amin Khan
- Narrated by: Asaduzzaman Noor; Progya Laboni
- Cinematography: Asaduzzaman Asad; Rajib Das
- Edited by: Moin Al Helal Supal
- Music by: Pintu Ghosh
- Production companies: Nazrul Center, Dhaka
- Release date: 20 November 2020 (Dhaka)
- Running time: 94 mins
- Country: Bangladesh
- Language: Bengali

Biography of Nazrul is a 2020 full-length documentary film directed by Ferdous Khan. The film, produced by Al Amin Khan, is based on the illustrious life and work of Kazi Nazrul Islam, National Poet of Bangladesh, under the initiative of Dhaka-based Nazrul Center which was advised by Ikram Ahmed. The scenes of the film have been shot in the places where the memories of Kazi Nazrul Islam are scattered from his birth to his death. In the film, the biography of Kazi Nazrul Islam is narrated in the background voice of Asaduzzaman Noor and Progya Laboni. The documentary was commercially released in theaters on 20 November 2020.

== Background ==
Biography of Nazrul is a documentary film based on real narrative and free from fiction. Kazi Nazrul Islam's complete life is presented in the form of a documentary through the exhibition of memorial sites, work eulogies and reminiscences of personal life. The documentary begins with the description of the Nazrul's pre-birth socio-economic conditions of Churulia of Asansol Mahakuma in Burdwan district of British Bengal. Nazrul's birth, parents, relatives, his early years, singing in a musical team named Letodal, studying in Kuttab and primary school, coming from work in bread shop in Asansol to study in Trishal, returning to Asansol, his birthplace, till the last days of his education phase in the local school is arranged in the first part. In the second part, Nazrul's soldier life, returning to Kolkata from the war, literary journalism, political life, prison life, important events of family life, namely - arrival in Comilla, marriage with Nargis, marriage with Promila, living in many houses in Kolkata, living in Krishnanagar, arrival in Bangladesh and end days are described. The documentary has tried to portray Kazi Nazrul as a communist.

== Production ==
The production span of Biography of Nazrul is about two years. Pre-production planning for the film began in May 2018. After researching Nazrul's life, filming began on 5 October 2018 at Darirampur School in Trishal, the place of childhood memory of Kazi Nazrul Islam. After that, filming continued in places where Kazi Nazrul's memory is buried in Bangladesh and India. Scenes were shot at Shimla village of Kazi in Trishal, Darirampur Namapara, Jatiya Kabi Kazi Nazrul Islam University, Mymensingh, Nazrul Bhaban at Dhanmondi, Mausoleum of Kazi Nazrul Islam at Dhaka University Mosque premises, Bangla Academy, Nargis's residence at Daulatpur in Comilla District, Historical Bread Shop at Asansol Bazar, Asansol Thana, Asansol Junction railway station, Kazi Nazrul University, Kazi Nazrul's residence and birthplace in Churulia, Churulia Nazrul Academy, Ajay River, Kazi Nazrul Islam Airport at Durgapur, Kolkata, Hooghly and Krishnanagar. Along with Nazrul's work, Kazi Nazrul's daughter-in-law Uma Kazi and Kalyani Kazi, nephew Rezaul Kazi and granddaughter Khilkhil Kazi shared their reminiscent interviews about narrative and personal lives of Rafiqul Islam, Mohammad Nurul Huda, Khairul Anam Shakil, Anisuzzaman, Serajul Islam Choudhury, Soumitra Sekhar Dey, Khalid Hossain, Leena Tapsee, Ramanuj Dasgupta, Nupur Ganguly and Badhan Sengupta. Filming ended in March 2020.

== Release ==
Biography of Nazrul received approval for screening from Film Censor Board of Bangladesh on 29 July 2020. The first screening and commercial release of the film was held in Dhaka on 20 November of the same year. The film was aired on Bangladesh Television for the television audience on Kazi Nazrul Islam's birth anniversary in 2021.

== Accolades ==
Year	Festival	Category	Result	Ref.
2020	Cinemaking International Film Festival	Best Feature Film	Won	
