= Kazi Anowar Hossain =

Bangladeshi painter (1941–2007)

Kazi Monowar Hossain
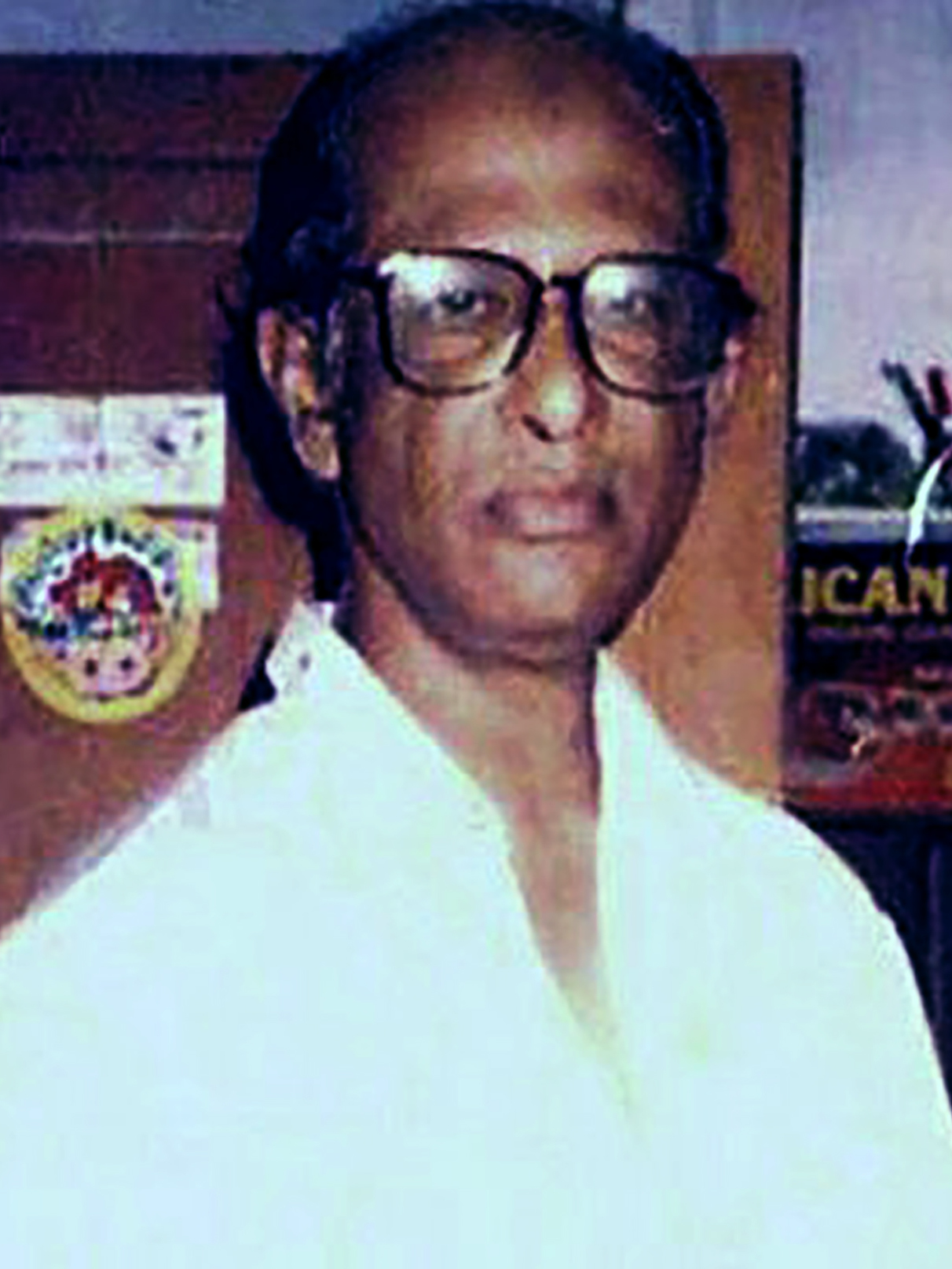
- Hossain at his home in 1985
- Born: 14 January 1941; Gopalganj, Bengal Presidency, British India
- Died: 8 February 2007 (aged 66)
- Education: University of Dhaka
- Occupation: Painters
- Years active: 1965–2007
- Awards: Ekushey Padak
- Website: kazianowar.com

Kazi Anowar Hossain (14 January 1941 – 8 February 2007) was a Bangladeshi painter who was known for his classical portrayal of rural Bengal. He was awarded Ekushey Padak in 2016 posthumously by the Government of Bangladesh.

== Early life ==
Kazi Anowar Hossain was born into a prominent Bengali Muslim Kazi family in Gopalganj, his father was a Police Inspector in British India, and his mother Ohidunessa was a housewife, he was second born amongst his thirteen siblings. Although born in Gopalganj District he grew up in Madaripur, in the service of his father. While studying in secondary school, he started as a painter. After completing his graduation in 1964 from the Faculty of Fine Arts, University of Dhaka, he concentrated entirely on painting.

== Career ==
At the beginning of his career, Hossain painted the pictures of the rural village of Bengal And later he liked to paint miniature pictures. His drawings were displayed differently and jointly with more than 22 out of country and country. During the 1988 flood, he sold photographs and donated the money. The President Sheikh Mujibur Rahman gifted a portrait of a boat drawn by Hossain to Indian Prime Minister Indira Gandhi.

Hossain created more than 2000 paintings. The Painter Kazi Anowar Hossain Award was posthumously launched in his memory in 2019.
