= Kamrun Nahar =

Bangladeshi soil scientist and environmentalist

- কামরুন নাহার
- Born: Dacca, East Pakistan
- Education: University of Natural Resources and Life Sciences, Vienna
- Known for: Soil chemistry Climate change Biofuel
- Scientific career
- Fields: Soil science Agronomy
- Workplaces: Independent University, Bangladesh; BRAC University; North South University; Sher-e-Bangla Agricultural University; University of Florida; Washington State University
- Thesis: Einfluss von Wasserstress auf Nährstoffaufnahme, Ertrag und Fruchtqualität von Tomaten (Lycopersicon esculentum Mill.) unter subtropischen Bedingungen (2000)
- Doctoral advisor: Ralph Gretzmacher
- Other academic advisors: S.M. Ullah
- Website: kamrunnahar.com

Kamrun Nahar is a Bangladeshi soil scientist and environmentalist. A prominent biofuels researcher from Bangladesh, her research also aimed to lower dependence on petroleum based foreign oil by producing low carbon and sulphur emitting biofuels from the second generation energy crops cultivated in the unused wastelands of Bangladesh for use in home generators to supplement power.

An elected member of the Asiatic Society of Bangladesh, she was also the former secretary of the Institute of Environmental Professionals – Bangladesh in 2003. She is an associate professor of environmental science and management at North South University and held similar teaching positions at BRAC University and at Independent University, Bangladesh, since 2000.

== Education ==
She was born in 1961 to the Munshibari family of Comilla, where author Saleh Uddin was her older brother. She is the sister-in-law of Raihanul Abedin. Upon graduation from Eden College, she attended the University of Dhaka's Department of Soil, Water and Environment in 1977. In 1978, she studied soil chemistry under Iajuddin Ahmed. She graduated with a BS degree in soil science in 1981 and an MS degree in soil chemistry in 1982. She was married to Muhammad Shahid Sarwar in 1981. The same year she was awarded the First Class Honours Award by the Dhaka Education Board.

In 1997, she traveled to Europe to attend the Department of Applied Plant Sciences and Plant Biotechnology for a PhD at the University of Natural Resources and Life Sciences, Vienna in Austria (Institut f. Pflanzenzuchtung u. Pflanzenbau Uni. F. Bodenkultur Wien, Osterreich) as an Austrian Academic Exchange Fellow. She has also been a visiting scholar at the University of Florida and Washington State University in the United States.

== Background ==
Nahar first proposed to cultivate a non-food bioenergy crop, Jatropha curcas L. in Bangladesh, as it did not need arable land and does not compete with food. Her work focused on the increasing water deficit conditions due to global climate change and its relationship to fruit yield, particularly in combating world hunger. Her publications also center around bioenergy and food production in both the cyclical water deficit lands and the highly flooded plains of Bangladesh. Emphasizing land use patterns and possible cultivation areas of Bangladesh, she stressed the uses and socioeconomic benefits of the plant, citing minimal production costs and ease for the production of biodiesel and other useful byproducts compared to conventional fossil fuel. Carbon sequestration was also implied in the national scheme.

=== Soil fertility and water deficiency ===
In the early 1980s, Nahar began analysing the soils of different areas of the country. Twenty soil samples belonging to four pedons from Bhola District were analysed for their profile morphology, particle-size distribution, and mineral composition in the clay fraction. Fine to medium-sized mottles with distinct contrast were present in almost all the horizons. Structural B (cambic) horizon has developed in all the pedons where clay content ranged from 17 to 42%. The texture of the soils ranged from silt loam to silty clay loam. Mica and kaolinite were the two other minerals whose abundance was nearly equal. The occurrence of small quantities of mica-vermiculite intergrades and some interstratified clay minerals was suspected. A small portion of smectites was considered to be formed authigenically in the soils from Bhola.

Later, a total of twenty-one soil samples belonging to five representative soil series were collected on a horizon basis from the three distinct vegetative zones of Raojan Rubber Garden, Chittagong and analysed for their different properties. The different horizons of the profiles studied were truly pedogenetic. Sand was the dominant fraction of the soil, which might indicate that the parent materials were arenaceous in nature. The texture of the soil ranged from loamy sand to sandy loam at the surface and sandy loam to sandy clay loam at the subsurface. The sand/silt ratio indicated that the studied profiles did not form on uniform parent materials. Moisture percentage of air dry soils ranged from 0.3 to 2.6. A positive correlation existed between percent clay and hygroscopic moisture of the soils.

=== Drought-resistant plants and crop yield ===
Since then, Nahar's research has focused on increasing water deficit conditions due to global climate change and its relationship to fruit yield, particularly in combating world hunger. Her publications also center around bioenergy and food production in both the cyclical water deficit lands and the highly flooded plains of Bangladesh. The influence of water stress on tomato plants and fruit quality was investigated in a pot experiment. The uptake of nitrogen, sodium, potassium, sulphur, calcium and magnesium was significantly reduced by water stress in the plants. Significant increases in glucose, fructose, sucrose in fruits and proline content in leaves showed some tendency of this crop to adjust osmotically to water stress. Water stress increased the sugar and acid contents (ascorbic, malic and citric acid) of the tomato fruits and thus improved the fruit quality. This study investigates the effects of water stress on moisture content distribution at different soil layers (pot) and on the morphological characters of tomato plants. Moisture content distribution was higher at the surface and decreased with increasing stress at all growth stages. Yield and related morphological characters responded better at certain of the field capacity compared when with other treatments. A study was conducted in the experimental field of Sher-e-Bangla Agricultural University in Dhaka, Bangladesh, to study the effect of water stress on fruit quality and osmotic adjustment in different types. The plants had a tendency to adjust against a drop in potential in the soil by producing organic solutes such as glucose, fructose, sucrose and proline. The quality of fruits was improved as a result of the synthesis of ascorbic acid, citric acid and malic acid. No physical damage due to stress was observed in fruits, which were over 90% red. Another such test conducted studied the effect of water stress on the height, dry matter and yield of a few cultivars where it was noticed that the yield was reduced due to stress but no significant difference was observed.

=== Second-generation bioenergy crops ===
Nahar also worked on energy crops, especially their adaptability in different soil types of Bangladesh, especially wastelands choosing second generation energy crops not in high demand in the global food market and thus has little impact on food prices and food security thereby negating the food-fuel dilemma. She explored the potential of biofuel production on a limited land space for sustaining a growing population like Bangladesh. With rapidly growing urban and national population growth rate, Bangladesh's growing demand for energy with urban expansion has led to deforestation and a steady loss of arable lands, which may result in future food shortages, where she proposes a simple required land use per capita model (Note: $\alpha_{fuel}$, $P_{total}$ is the total number of people using this source of energy, $X_{vi}$ is the average driving distance per vehicle and:$n_{vi}$ is the total distance to be traveled, is the average $M_{vi}$, hence, $LU_{req, fuel-1}={1 \over C_y}.{\alpha_{fuel} \over P_{total}}.\sum_{i=1}^{n}\left[ \frac{\left(X_{vi}\right) \times n_{vi}}{M_{vi}} \right]$) for establishing a relationship between the biomass production, (Note: Where the current planned theoretical production is given by, $P_{theo,c}=A_{c,t} \times C_y \times h_i$ and optimal production by $P_{max,c}=C_{MP,C} \times h_i$; with $A_{c,t}$, $C_y$, $C_{MP,C}$ and $h_i$; where $C_y=\beta_{xy} \times \rho_{xy} \times \epsilon_{f}$ with $\beta_{xy}$, $\rho_{xy}$ (after pretreatment conversion) and $\epsilon_{f}$.) associated crop yields, the biomass to biofuel conversion methods and the overall fuel demand, as a plan to meet the national energy and habitable land demands while considering the looming environmental effects related to energy usage.

== See also ==
- Climate change in Bangladesh
- Sustainable biofuel
- Energy crop
- Kaberi Gayen
- Drought Resistant Plant (Xerophyte)
- Food vs. fuel Dilemma
- Floods in Bangladesh

== Sources ==
Notes
