= Shamez Uddin Ahmed =

Pakistani judge (1913–1968)

Shamez Uddin Ahmed شمݥالدين أحمد শামেজ উদ্দিন আহমেদ
- Born: Muhammad Shamez Uddin Ahmad; Bengal Province, British Empire
- Education: Naogaon K.D. School
- Known for: Hereditary Qadi

Mullah Mu'hammad Shamez-ud'din Ahmed (Bengali: মোল্লা শামেজ উদ্দিন আহমেদ, Arabic, Urdu:شمݥالدين أحمد in British India, 1913 – 1968 in East Pakistan) was the hereditary Qadi of Natore, seated at Singra Upazila in the erstwhile Indian Empire (and then East Pakistan, and finally present day Bangladesh).

== Biography ==
Born in the British Empire before the First World War, he was the son of Mullah Muhammad Jasim ud'din Ahmed, who was a relative of Muhammad Faiz-ud'din Ahmed, the father of Muhammad Zunaid Ahmed. His paternal line was descended from Mullah Shah Badakhshi and were known as Mullahbari Kazi family, his father, a landowner in Shercole, maintained residences in the Bombay Presidency (near the present day Indian city of Mumbai) and in Darjeeling (then part of Nepal).

He attended Naogaon K.D. Government High School from where he matriculated in the mid 1930s. He was an only son, and his father died in his youth at 1923, and his mother, Khadeja Khanem was regent during his minority.

=== Succession ===
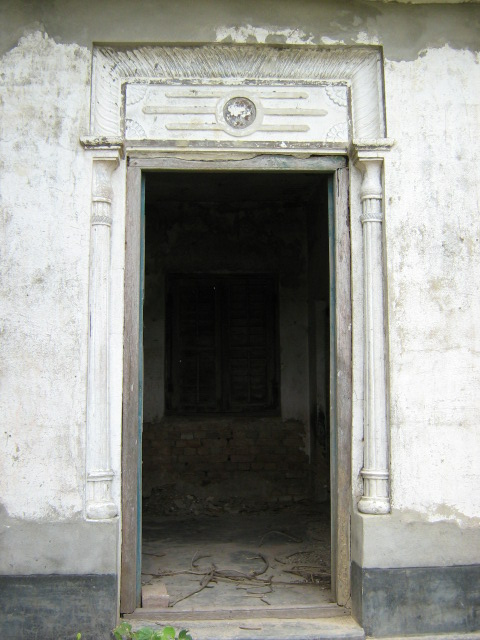
The deserted entrance way to the Qadi's durbar hall (Boithok Khaana) on the Mullahbare estate near the mansion

The title Mullah (Arabic: ملا) used by the family was used to show respect to educated Muslim leaders of the clergy. The rulers of Muslim India used the institution of the Qadi (Arabic: قاضي), who was given the responsibility for total administrative, judicial and fiscal control over a territory or a town. He would maintain all the civil records as well.

He would also retain a small army or force to ensure that his rulings are enforced. In most cases, the kazi (qadi) would pass on the title and position to his son, descendant or a very close relative. Over the centuries, this profession became a title within the families, and the power remained within one family in a region. Throughout South Asia, various such families are found who descended through their ancestors and retained the lands and position. Each family is known by the town or city that their ancestors controlled.

=== Family ===
In 1935, he was married to Gulbadan Begum of Natore, the eldest daughter of Jalaluddin Mirza, the Zamindar of Natore. He had four sons and two daughters who survived to adulthood. He died at Rajshahi Medical College in 1968 and is buried in the Singranatore estate next to his wife, and parents. He was succeeded by his oldest son.

- Akhtar Hussain the former General Manager of Bangladesh National Oils.
- Gole Afroz Bengali socialite and wife of MM Rahmatullah.
- Abu Naser Muhammad Asad-uz-zaman, a professor in Bogra, died 1997.
- Colonel Muhammad Shahid Sarwar, military commander of Rajshahi, the family's home state
- Lieutenant Colonel Muhammad Sarwar Alam, military officer.
- Gulroze Nahar Chowdhury, a lawyer.

== Bibliography ==
- Qureshi, Dr. Ishtiaq Husain (1942). The Administration of the Sultanate of Delhi. Pakistan Historical Society. p. 313.
