= Mausoleum of Kazi Nazrul Islam =

Resting place of the national poet of Bangladesh

- কাজী নজরুল ইসলামের সমাধিসৌধ
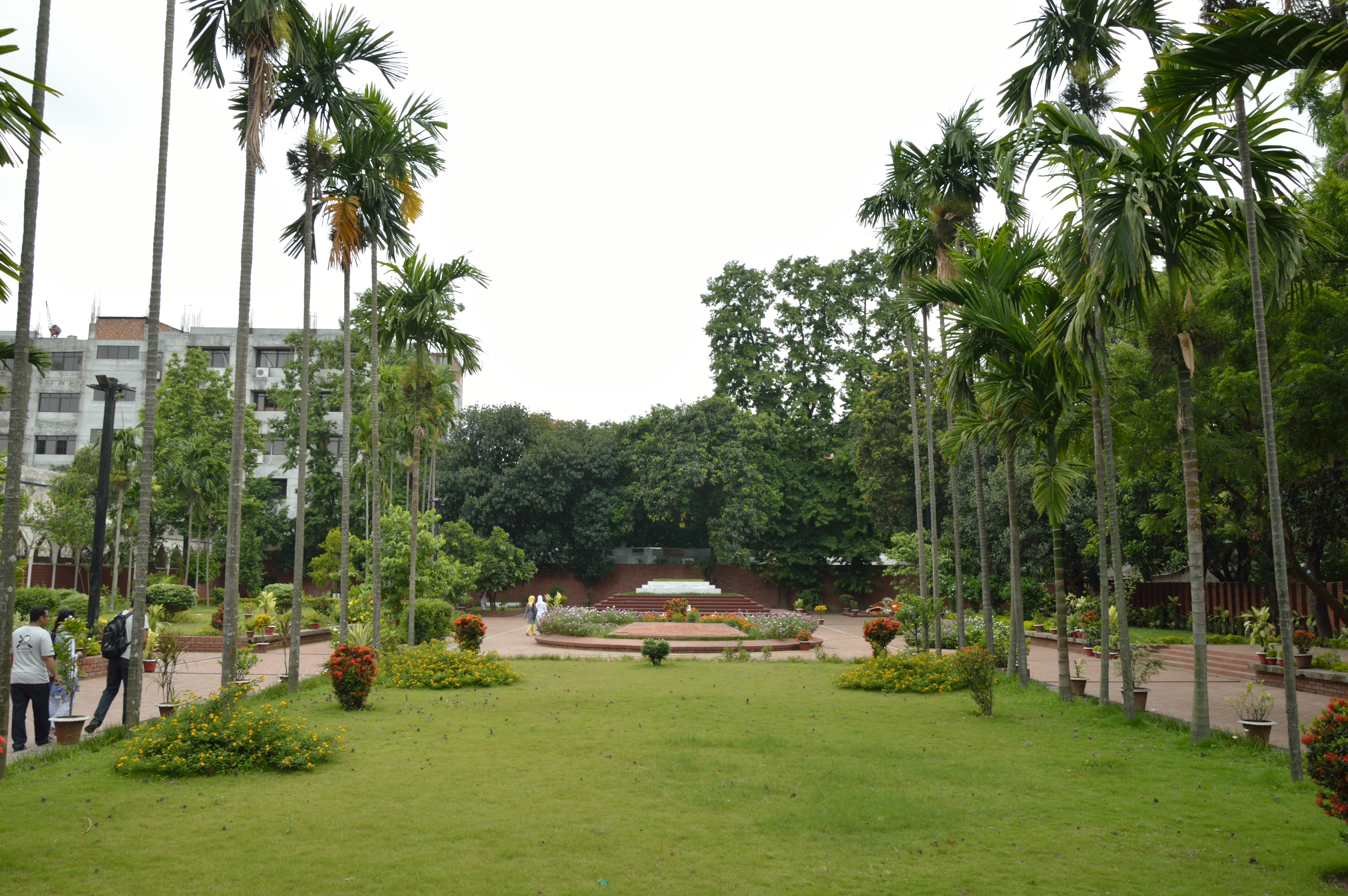
- Grave of Kazi Nazrul Islam at the mausoleum
- Interactive map of the Mausoleum of Kazi Nazrul Islam area

General information
- Type: Mausoleum
- Location: University of Dhaka, Shahbag, Dhaka
- Coordinates: 23.7350638°N 90.3949814°E
- Construction started: 1999
- Inaugurated: 2009
- Client: Government of Bangladesh

Design and construction
- Architect: Muzharul Islam

The mausoleum of Kazi Nazrul Islam is a mausoleum located in Dhaka, the capital of Bangladesh. It marks the grave of Kazi Nazrul Islam, the 20th-century writer, musician, and the national poet of Bangladesh. He died on 29 August 1976 and was buried here in the same year. Later, his grave was converted into a mausoleum. The mausoleum, designed by Mazharul Islam, was inaugurated in 2009. In addition to the grave of Islam, the mausoleum complex also contains the graves of personalities from the University of Dhaka and other national figures of Bangladesh.

== Background ==
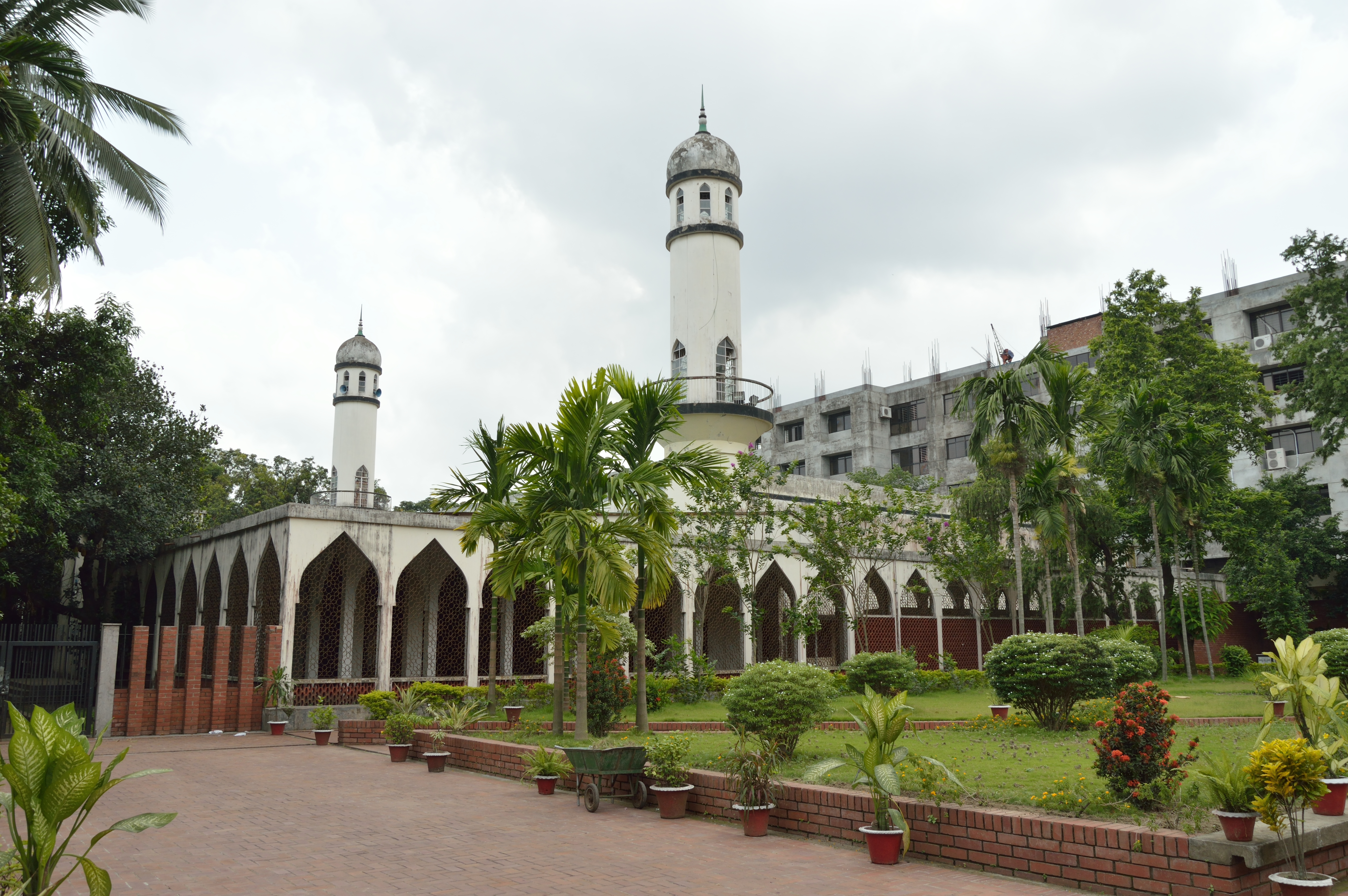
Kazi Nazrul Islam was buried beside the Central Mosque of the University of Dhaka

Bengali poet Kazi Nazrul Islam wrote a poem with the line "Mosjideri Pashe Amay Kobor Diyo Bhai, Jeno Gore Thekeo Moazziner Azan Shunte Pai" (lit. 'Bury me next to the mosque, brother, so that I can hear the call to adhan from the muezzin') which was published as Nazrul Geeti in 1940.

Bangladesh became independent on 16 December 1971. Then on 24 May 1972, after getting permission from the Indian government, Bangladeshi prime minister Sheikh Mujibur Rahman brought Bengali poet Kazi Nazrul Islam and his family from Kolkata to Dhaka. Then the poet started living in Bangladesh with his family. He was admitted to Dhaka's PG Hospital on 23 July 1975. After getting citizenship on 18 February 1976, his physical condition started to deteriorate. After his death on 29 August 1976, Islam was buried next to the central mosque of University of Dhaka, as per the wishes expressed in the poem.

== Construction ==
The foundation stone of the project to convert Kazi Nazrul Islam's tomb area into a mausoleum was laid on 25 May 1999 and the mausoleum was inaugurated on 27 August 2009, after ten years, by Prime Minister Sheikh Hasina. On 16 February 2011, two persons named Jaynath Nandi and Debashish Bhattacharya from the Indian state West Bengal traveled to Bangladesh on a bicycle with soil from the grave of Kazi Nazrul Islam's wife Pramila Kazi located in Churulia. On 28 February, they placed that soil on the grave of Islam. The mausoleum complex, designed by Muzharul Islam, was constructed encompassing the graves of several other notable individuals besides him located in the area.

== List of burials ==
Name	Identity	Birth	Death
Kazi Nazrul Islam	National Poet of Bangladesh	24 May 1899	29 August 1976
Zainul Abedin	National Professor of Bangladesh and painter	29 December 1914	28 May 1976
Quamrul Hassan	Painter and designer of the present national flag of Bangladesh	2 December 1921	2 February 1988
Muzaffar Ahmed Chowdhury	Vice-Chancellor of the University of Dhaka and first President of the Dhaka University Central Students' Union	23 November 1922	17 January 1978
Abdul Matin Chowdhury	Bangladeshi physicist and Vice-Chancellor of the University of Dhaka	1 May 1921	24 June 1981
Osman Hadi	Bangladeshi poet and political activist	30 June 1993	18 December 2025

== Controversies ==
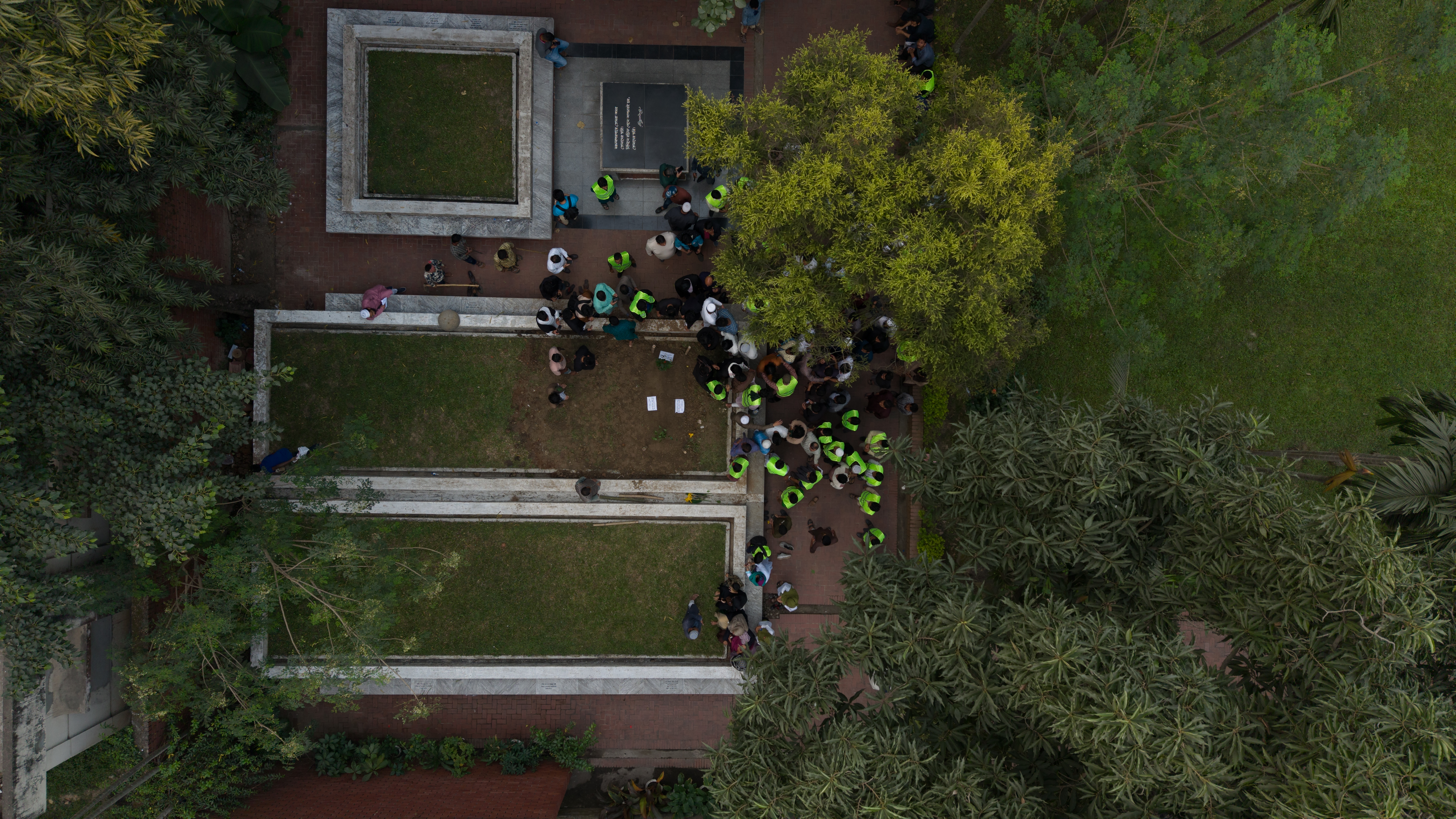
Osman Hadi being buried beside the grave of Kazi Nazrul Islam.

On 25 May 1999, the plaque on the grave of Islam bearing his written wish to be buried beside a mosque after his death was demolished. The newly installed plaque did not include that line.

Within the mausoleum complex, a terracotta memorial featuring several lines from Islam's poem Bidrohi has been installed. One word of the poem engraved on this memorial was misspelled.

In 2025, political activist Osman Hadi was buried at the mausoleum complex. However, the Kazi family described the choice of this site for Hadi's burial as unethical. They expressed concern that, in the future, Islam's grave might no longer remain there.

== Gallery ==
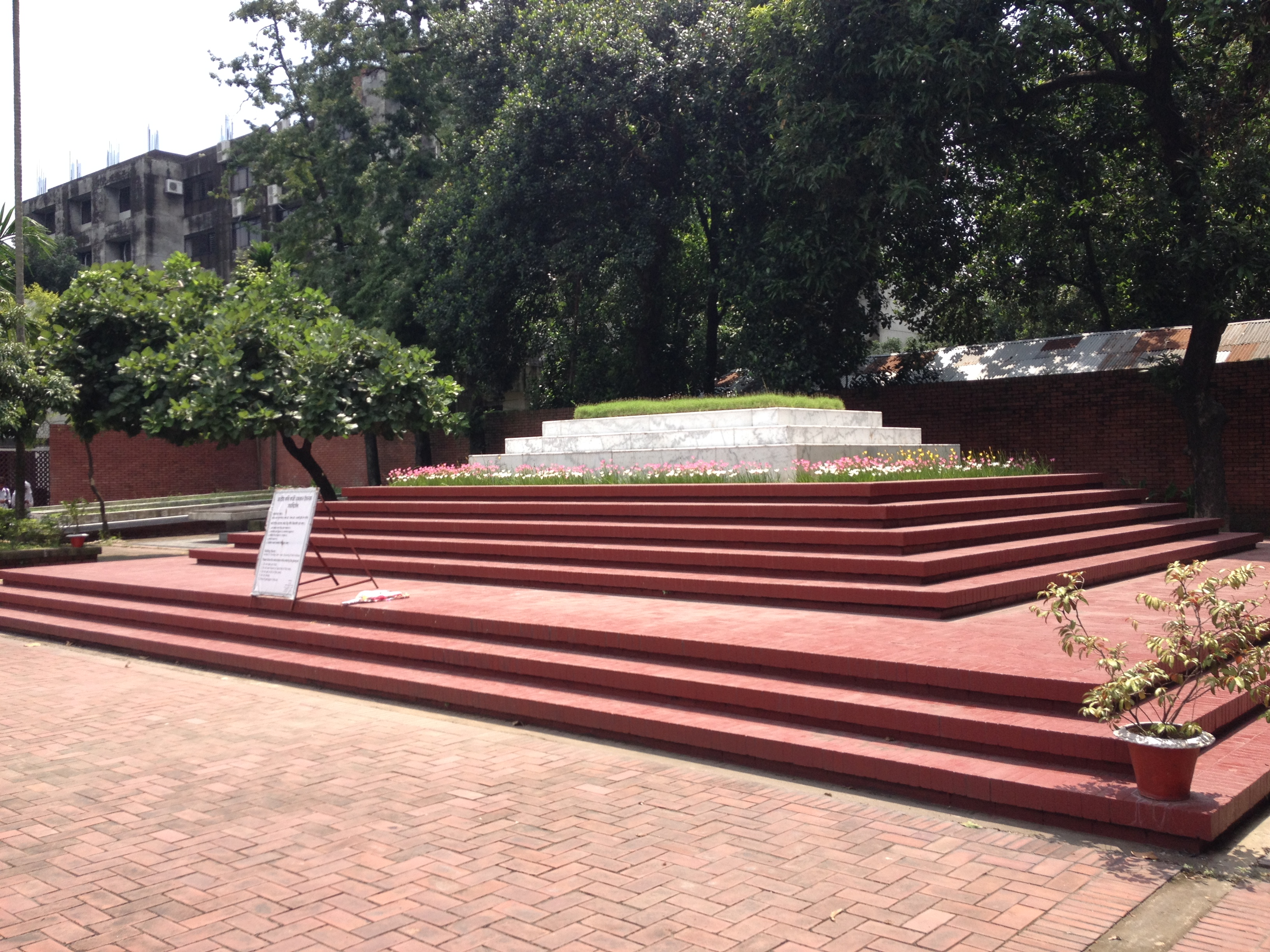
Grave of Kazi Nazrul Islam

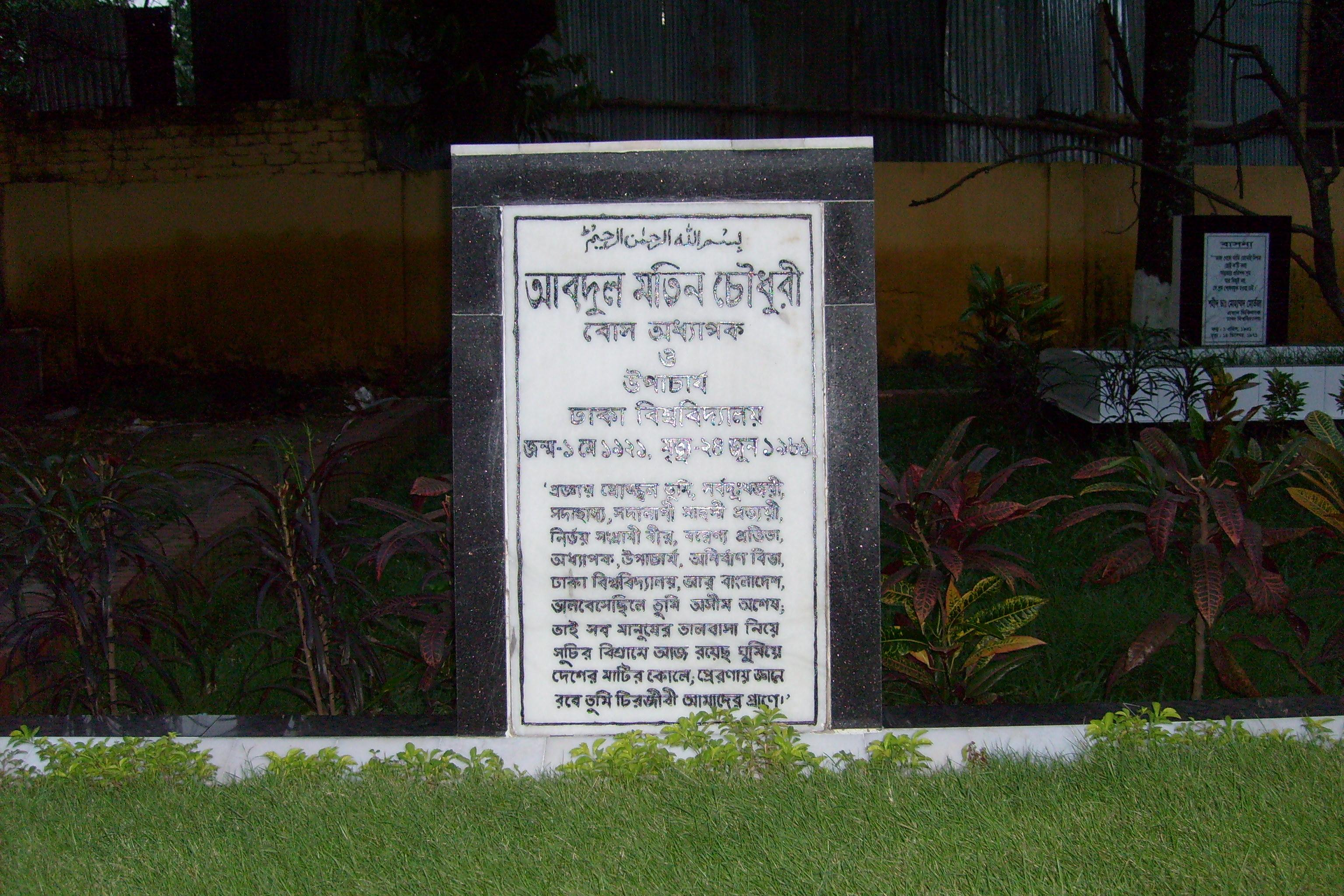
Grave of Abdul Motin Chowdhury

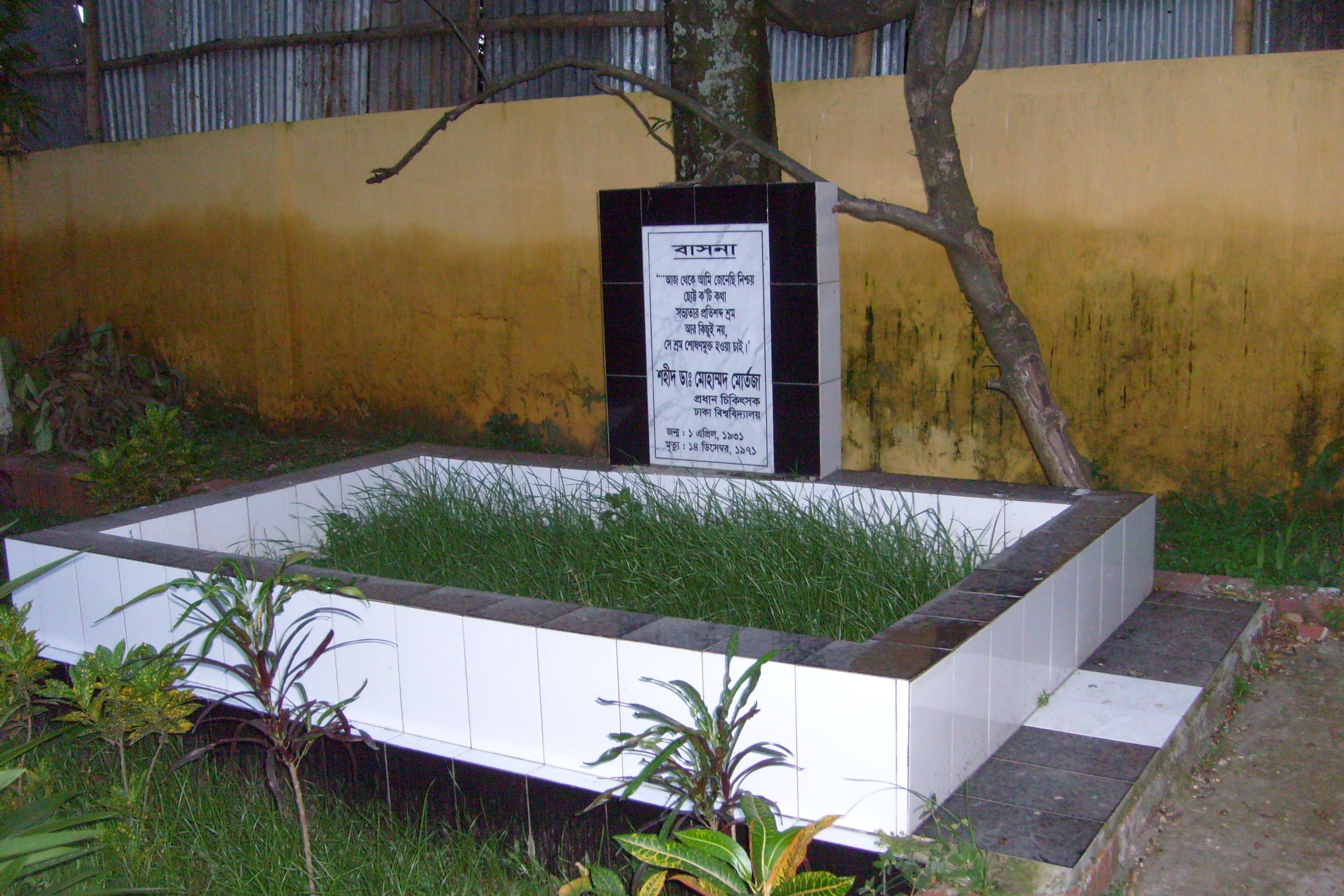
Grave of Mohammad Mortoza

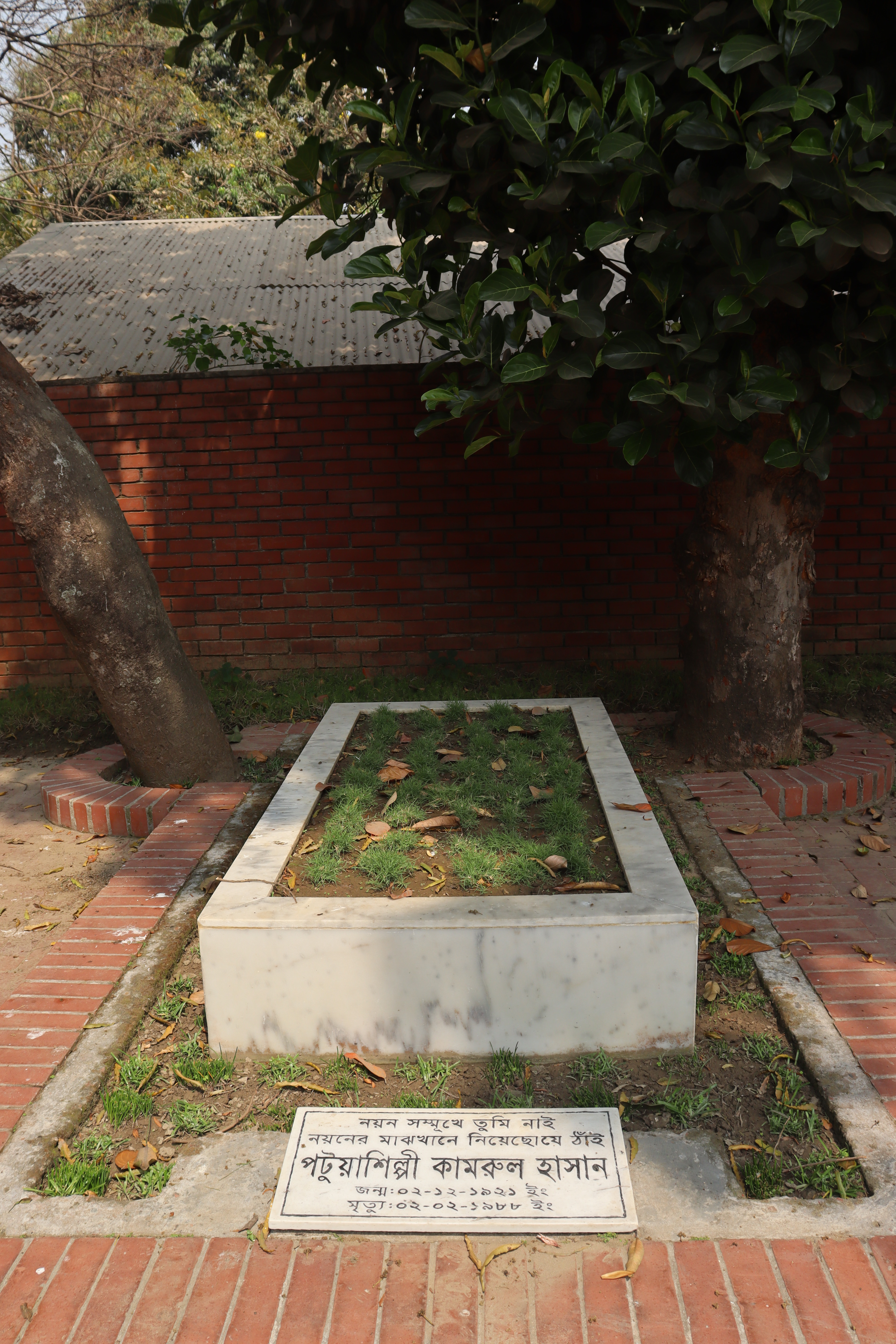
Grave of Quamrul Hassan

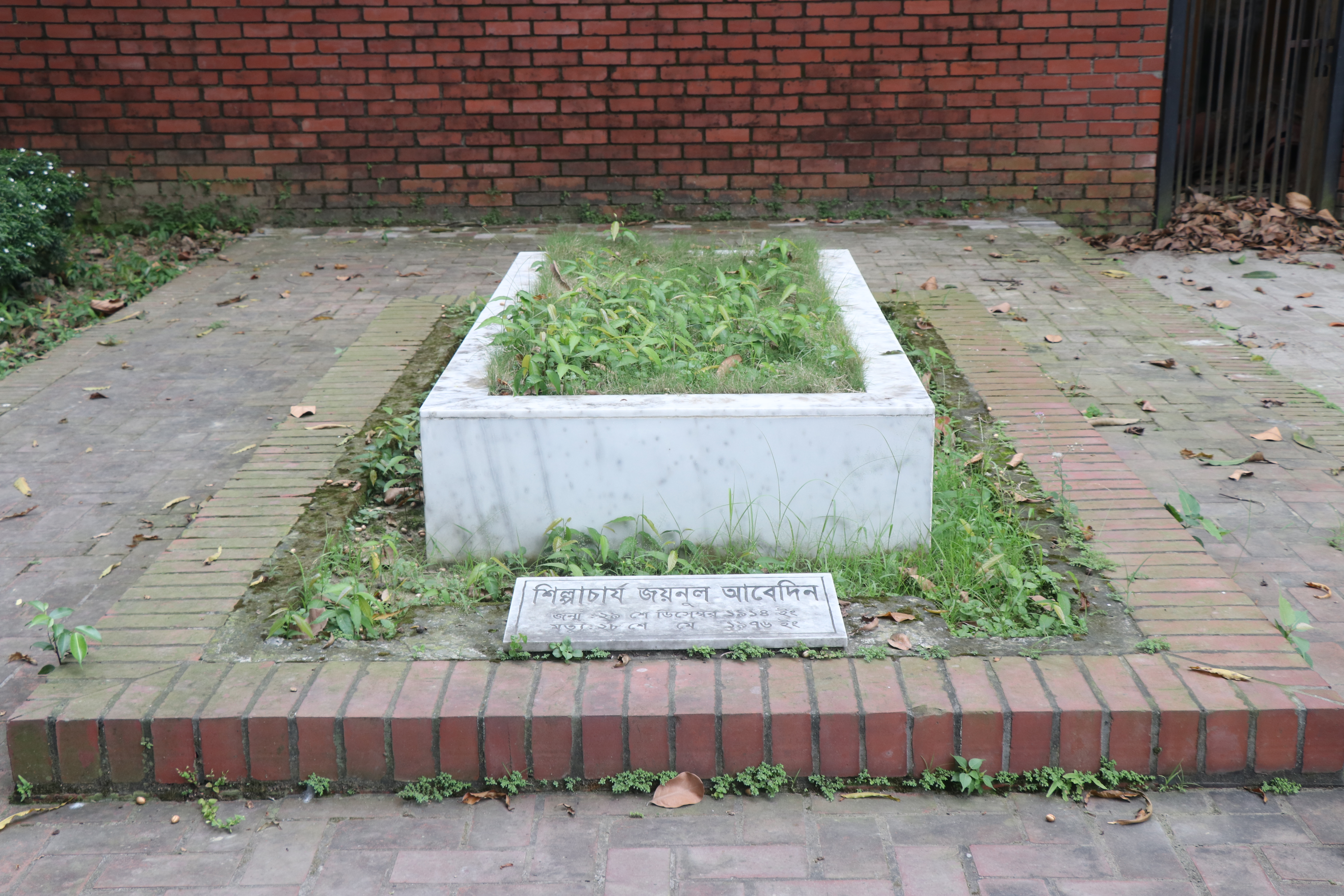
Grave of Zainul Abedin

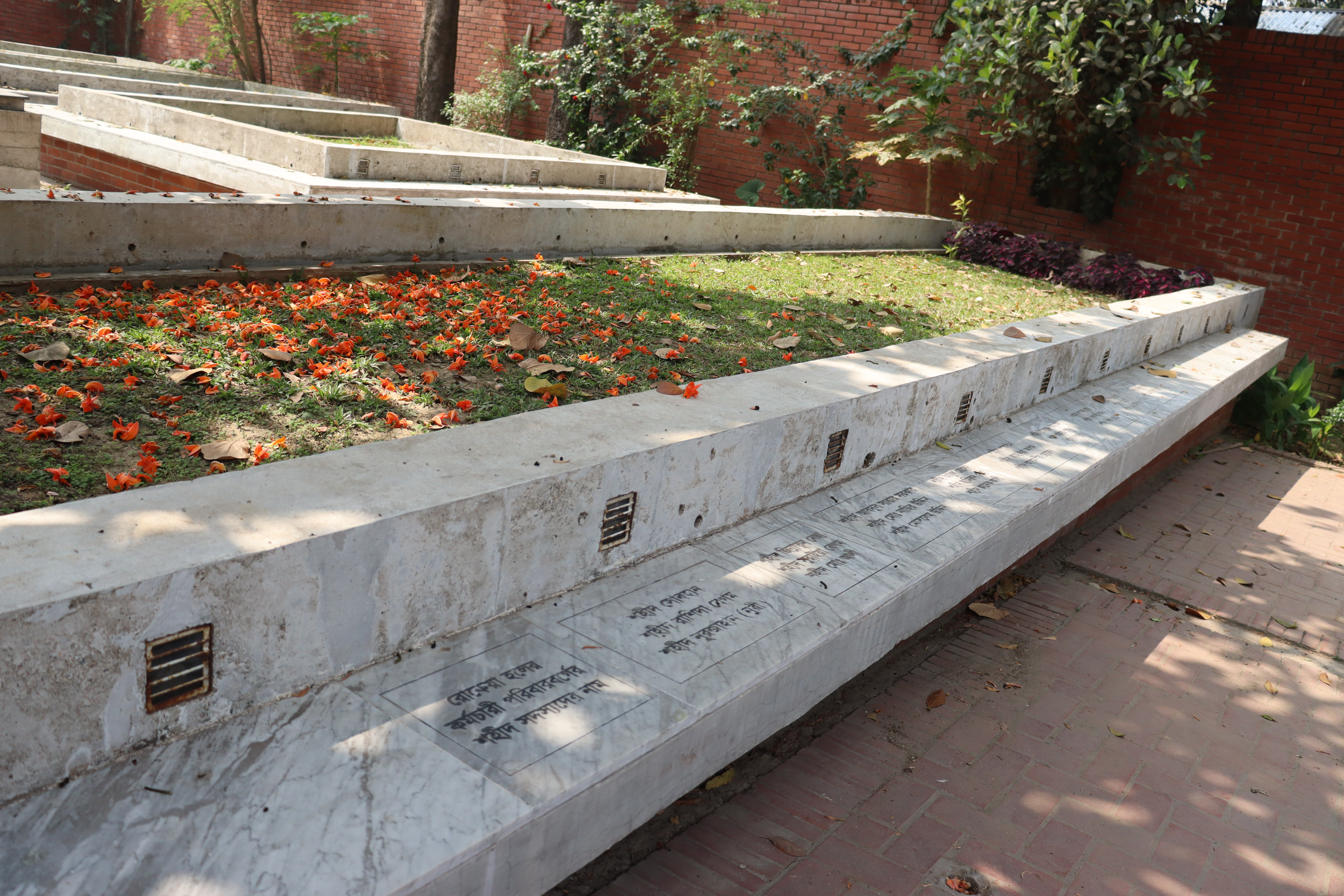
Graves of the intellectuals killed in 1971
