= S. M. Ullah =

Bangladeshi-Austrian soil scientist

- Born: East Pakistan
- Education: Universität für Bodenkultur, Wien; Jahangirnagar University
- Known for: Heavy metals in Crops; Arsenic Contamination
- Scientific career
- Fields: Agronomy; Soil Science; Soil contamination
- Workplaces: Vienna University of Life Sciences; Dhaka University
- Doctoral students: Kamrun Nahar

Shah Mohammad Ullah (Bengali: শাহ মোঃ উললাহ), is a Bangladeshi-Austrian soil scientist and environmentalist, who primarily researches arsenic contamination in the air and water.

The former chairman of the Department of Soil, Water and Environment at the University of Dhaka, the oldest department in the country, he led projects in the field of heavy metal contamination in crops, in collaboration with the Seibersdorf Research Center, Austria and the Ministry of Science and Technology, Government of Bangladesh.

== Background ==
As a full professor of Dhaka University, Ullah completed his BSc from the Dhaka University, and then his MSc and D.Agri from the University of Natural Resources and Life Sciences, Vienna. He was made chairman before the 60th Anniversary of the Department, predating the country's age. At DU, he was both a colleague and successor of Iajuddin Ahmed. Concerned with the national water situation, Ullah presided over the 2011 World Water Day event in Bangladesh, hosting the Health Minister who sought to improve access to safe drinking water.

He predicted that the entry of metals into the food chain through plant uptake might cause health hazards and also environmental problems in 1999. In 2010, Dhaka, the capital of Bangladesh saw a large number of deaths among the trees growing in the city according to The Daily Star. Ullah said that the soil problems or air pollution might be responsible for the deaths of the trees, especially if the level of metals such as copper, nickel, lead, cadmium and zinc goes up in the soil, he said. Besides, a rise in sulphuric, nitric, hydrochloric and other types of acid in the air could also cause the leaves of trees to decay, thereby killing them. He pointed out that trees grow under these constraints in industrial areas where air remains highly polluted. Furthermore, he added that the soil used for filling up lowlands for the Bashundhara Housing Project should be analysed to find the reasons behind it.

He was also a freedom fighter in the 1971 Liberation War against Pakistan.

=== Selected publications ===
- Monira, B.; S.M. Ullah, A. S. Mollah and N. Chowdhury (2005). "^{137}Cs-Uptake into Wheat (Triticum Vulgare) Plants from Five Representative Soils of Bangladesh". Environmental Monitoring and Assessment. 104 (1–3): 59–69. Bibcode:2005EMnAs.104...59M. doi:10.1007/s10661-005-1601-0. PMID 15931978. S2CID 21882349.
- Chamon, A. S.; M. H. Gerzabek, M. N. Mondol, S.M. Ullah, M. Rahman & W. E. H. Blum (2005). "Influence of Soil Amendments on Heavy Metal Accumulation in Crops on Polluted Soils of Bangladesh". Communications in Soil Science and Plant Analysis. 36 (7–8): 907–924. Bibcode:2005CSSPA..36..907C. doi:10.1081/CSS-200049472. S2CID 95104215.
- Chamon, A. S.; M. H. Gerzabek, M. N. Mondol, S.M. Ullah, M. Rahman & W. E. H. Blum (2005). "Influence of Cereal Varieties and Site Conditions on Heavy Metal Accumulations in Cereal Crops on Polluted Soils of Bangladesh". Communications in Soil Science and Plant Analysis. 36 (7–8): 889–906. Bibcode:2005CSSPA..36..907C. doi:10.1081/CSS-200049472. S2CID 95104215.
- Salam, Abdus; Heidi Bauer, Karin Kassin, Shah Mohammad Ullah and Hans Puxbaum (2003). "Aerosol chemical characteristics of an island site in the Bay of Bengal (Bhola – Bangladesh)". Journal of Environmental Monitoring. 5 (3): 483–490. doi:10.1039/B212521H. PMID 12833993.
- Islam, A.; Ullah, S.M. (1973). "Chemistry of submerged soils and growth and yield of rice – II. Effect of additional application of fertilizers on soil at field capacity". Plant and Soil. 39 (3): 567–579. Bibcode:1973PlSoi..39..567I. doi:10.1007/BF00264174. ISSN 0032-079X. S2CID 29262734.
- Danneberg, O. H.; Ullah, S.M. (1982). "Chromatographische Unterscheidung von Huminstoffen und Nichthuminstoffen aus Schwarzerdehumus". Journal of Plant Nutrition and Soil Science (in German). 145 (6): 526–538. doi:10.1002/jpln.19821450604.
- Mollah, A.S.; Ullah, S.M. (1998). "Determination of distribution coefficient of ^{137}Cs and ^{90}Sr in soil from AERE, Savar". Waste Management. 18 (4): 287–291. Bibcode:1998WaMan..18..287M. doi:10.1016/S0956-053X(98)00031-2.
- Salam, Abdus; Heidi Bauer; Karin Kassin; Shah Mohammad Ullah; Hans Puxbau (2003). "Aerosol chemical characteristics of a mega-city in Southeast Asia (Dhaka–Bangladesh)". Atmospheric Environment. 37 (18): 2517–2528. Bibcode:2003AtmEn..37.2517S. doi:10.1016/S1352-2310(03)00135-3.

== See also ==
- Biogeochemistry
- Environmental radioactivity
- Heavy Metal Accumulation in Soils
- Soil Acidity
- Organic Pollutant
