= Ralph Gretzmacher =

Austrian agronomist

- Education: Universität für Bodenkultur, Wien
- Known for: Plant breeding Botany
- Scientific career
- Fields: Agronomy; Soil Science; Zoology
- Workplaces: Vienna University of Life Sciences

Ralph Gretzmacher is an Austrian scientist, professor of botany, zoology and an expert on tropical and subtropic agronomy.

The Austrian Representative for the European Coordination Group to the Food and Agriculture Organization of the United Nations, he was a former Head of the Austrian Delegate to the Consultative Group on International Agricultural Research, he completed his doctoral studies at the University of Natural Resources and Life Sciences, Vienna in 1968.

== Career ==
Gretzmacher has published scientific and academic papers for more than 40 years in the field of soil science and agronomy in Europe. He won the Adolf Schärf Prize in 1974.

In 2006, Gretzmacher led the project called Benefiting from an improved agricultural portfolio in Asia by the European Commission of the European Union (EU); formerly, he also led agricultural research projects in Namibia, Ethiopia, Kenya, Palestine and various other countries in Europe and Asia, as well as serving as a member of the Austrian Council of Asean-European University Network.

=== Bibliography ===
- Ashebir, D; Jezik, K; Weingartemann, H; Gretzmacher, R(2009): Change in color and other fruit quality characteristics of tomato cultivars after hot-air drying at low final-moisture content. Int. J Food Sci Nutr. 2009; 60: 308-315.
- Schmidt, M; Wei, W; Polthanee, A; Lam, NT; Chuong, S; Qiu, LJ; Banterng, P; Dung, PT; Glaser, S; Gretzmacher, R; Hager, V; de Korte, E; Li, YH; Phuong, NT; Ro, S; Zhang, ZY; Zhou, HF(2008): Ambiguity in a trans-disciplinary stakeholder assessment of neglected and underutilized species in China, Cambodia, Thailand and Vietnam. BIODIVERS CONSERV. 2008; 17(7): 1645-1666.
- Alemayehu Balcha, Gretzmacher, R., Vollmann, J.(2006): Genetic variation in nitrogen-use efficiency of tef,. J PLANT NUTR SOIL SC, 169, 704-710; ISSN 1436-8730
- Balcha, A., Gretzmacher, R., Vollmann, J.(2005): Genotypic variation for nitrogen utilization efficiency in tef [Eragrostis tef (Zucc.) Trotter] seedlings. J GENET BREED, 59, 27-32; ISSN 0394-9257
- N. Ghunheim, R. Gretzmacher(2005): Optimierung des Wassereinsatzes bei Erdbeere (Fragaria ananassa) im Gaza-Streifen/Palestina. In: A. Kämpf, W. Claupein, S. Graeff, W. Diepenbrock - Gesellschaft für Pflanzenbauwissenschaften: 48. Jahrestagung: "Wasser und Pflanzenbau - Herausforderungen für zukünftige Produktionssysteme", 27. bis 29. September 2005, Wien, 17, 259-260; Günter Heimbach, Stuttgart; ISBN 3-935380-16-X; ISSN 0934-5116
- Balcha, A., Gretzmacher, R., Vollmann, J.(2003): Estimation of genetic parameters for grain yield and yield related traits in tef [Eragrostis tef (Zucc.) Trotter]. Journal of Genetics and Breeding, 57, 251-257
- Nahar, K., Gretzmacher, R.(2002): Effect of water stress on nutrient uptake, yield and quality of tomato (Lycopersicon esculentum Mill.) under subtropical conditions. Die Bodenkultur, 53, 1, 45-51
- Sinebo, W., R. Gretzmacher, A. Edelbauer(2002): Environment of selection for grain yield in low fertilizer input barley. Field Crop Research 74, 151-162
- Stockinger, K., Vogl, C.R., Gretzmacher, R.(2002): Agroforestry Systems and Practices in Austria: Neglected but Powerful Examples for Potential Innovations in Organic Farming Systems in Temperate Climatic Regions.. In: Thompson, R. (Ed.), "Cultivating communities", 14th IFOAM Organic World Congress, 21. -24.8.2002, Victoria, Canada, 146; Canadian Organic Growers, Ottawa, Ontario, Canada in the 14th IFOAM Organic World Congress "Cultivating communities", Victoria, British Columbia, Canada, 21. -24.8.2002
- Tariqul Islam, M., R. Gretzmacher(2001): Grain growth pattern and yield performance of some transplanted aman rice cultivars in relation to moisture stress. The Bangladesh Journal of Nuclear Agriculture, 16/17, 21-28
- Sinebo, W., Gretzmacher, R.(1999): Variety, fertilisers, weed control and clover mixture effects on bread wheat in Ethiopia. Die Bodenkultur, 50, 3-9
- Gretzmacher, R., Schabazian, N.(1998): Improving the productivity of winter wheat in Iran through rotation of wheat, fallow, soybean and alfalfa and manuring.. Die Bodenkultur, 49, 151-157
- Czerwenka-Wenkstetten, I.M., Berner, K.K., Schilder, A., Gretzmacher, R.(1997): First Report and Pathogenicity of Myrothecium roridum, Curvularia eragrostidis and C. Iunata on seeds of Striga hermonthica in Nigeria.. Plant Disease, 81, 7, 832
- Darnhofer, I., Gretzmacher, R., Schneeberger, W.(1997): Modeling farmers' decisions for oats-vetch adaption in the Ethiopian Highlands. Die Bodenkultur, 48, 4, 271-280
- Vollmann, J; ElHadad, T; Gretzmacher, R; Ruckenbauer, P(1996): Seed protein content of soybean as affected by spatial variation in field experiments. PLANT BREED. 1996; 115(6): 501-507
- Gretzmacher, R., Schahbazian, N., Pourdavai, N.(1994): Einfluß von symbiontischem, organischem und anorganischem Stickstoff auf Ertrag und Qualität von Sojabohnen.. Die Bodenkultur, 45, 3, 253-267
- Vollmann, J., Gruber, H., Gretzmacher, R., Ruckenbauer, P.(1992): Note on the efficiency of artificial hybridization in soybean.. Die Bodenkultur, 43, 123-127
- Gretzmacher, R., H. Gruber, Vollmann, J.(1992): Results of a soybean research programme sponsored by the Austrian Ministry of Agriculture.. Poster, FAO Research Network on Soyabean, Sept. 2-4. 1992, Technical Meeting
- Gretzmacher, R.(1991): Umweltzerstörung durch den Bevölkerungsdruck am Beispiel Thailand.. Veröffentlichungen der Kommission für Humanökologie, Österreichische Akademie der Wissenschaften, 167-183
- Gretzmacher, R., T. Wolfsberger(1990): Die Bewässerungseffizienz bei Sojabohne (Glycine max L.Merr.), untersucht in Groß-Enzersdorf an der Sorte Evans in den Jahren 1980 bis 1989.. Die Bodenkultur, 41, 2, 125-135
- Gretzmacher, R.(1987): Untersuchungen mit Stecklingen der Batate (Ipomoea batatas (L.) Lam) in bezug auf eine optimale Vermehrungsrate.. Die Bodenkultur, 38, 2, 135-145
- Gretzmacher, R.(1981): Die Produktion von Hirse (Sorghum bicolor (L) Moech) im Sudan.. Die Bodenkultur, 32, 1, 13-34
- Gretzmacher, R.(1979): Die Abhängigkeit des Ertrages der Einzelpflanze und des Bestandes bei der Kartoffel (Solanum tuberosum L.) von der Pflanzenzahl je Fläche.. Die Bodenkultur, 30, 1, 21-40
- Gretzmacher, R.(1979): Das Ertragsverhalten von Sommergerste (Hordeum vulgare L.) und Durumweizen(Triticum durum Desf.) auf unterschiedliche Saatstärken einer experimentellen Breitsaat.. Die Bodenkultur, 30, 2, 151-180
- Gretzmacher, R.(1979): Die Beeinflussung des morphologischen Ertragsaufbaues und der Ertragsleistung durch den Standraum bei Körnermais.. Die Bodenkultur, 30, 3, 256-280
- Gretzmacher, R.(1978): Der Einfluß verschiedener Bestandesdichten auf die Struktur und Höhe des Ertrages von Paprika (Capsicum annuum L.) im Gewächshaus und Freiland.. Gartenbauwissenschaft, 43, 3, 97-103
- Gretzmacher, R.(1978): Die Reaktion der Sojabohne (Glycine max.(L.) Merr.) auf unterschiedlichen Bestandesdichten.. Die Bodenkultur, 29, 4, 333-350
- Gretzmacher, R.(1978): Ein Beitrag zur Entstehung von Kalkkrusten an Hand von Untersuchungen an Böden Südost-Spaniens.. Die Bodenkultur, 21, 2,111-126
- Gretzmacher, R.(1977): Untersuchungen über die Möglichkeit einer mechanisierten landwirtschaftlichen Großproduktion im East Central State (Nigeria).. Die Bodenkultur, 28, 3, 303-324
- Gretzmacher, R.(1977): Einfluß von pH-Wert, Eisen-Konzentration und Wurzelverletzung auf Wachstum und Mineralstoffgehalt von Rebstecklingen in Nährlösungen.. Mitt. Klosterneuburg, 27, 5, 207-214
- Gretzmacher, R., Tanasch, L.(1976): Soybean breeding in Austria.. Soybean Genetics Newsletter 3
- Gretzmacher, R.(1975): Standraumuntersuchungen bei Buschbohne (Phaseolus vulgaris L. var.nanus Asch.). II. Teil: Untersuchungen an rechteckigen Standräumen.. Die Bodenkultur, 26, 2, 163-174
- Gretzmacher, R.(1974): Sojaanbau in Österreich ?. Agrarische Rundschau, 1974, 1, 55-58
- Gretzmacher, R.(1974): Möglichkeit einer Sojaproduktion in Österreich. Lebensmittel und Ernährung, 27, 9, 201-205
- Gretzmacher, R.(1974): Standraumuntersuchungen bei Buschbohne (Phaseolus vulgaris L. var.nanus Asch.). Untersuchungen an quadratischen Standräumen.. Die Bodenkultur, 25, 4, 392-406
- Gretzmacher, R.(1973): Untersuchungen über die Wirkung von Wurzelverletzungen bei Karfiol (Brassica oleracea var. cauliflora).. Die Bodenkultur, 24, 1, 40-50
- Gretzmacher, R.(1972): Untersuchungen über die Wirkung der Hackarbeit bei Rotkraut (Brassica oleracea var. capitata L.).. Gartenbauwissenschaft, 37, 3, 179-189
- Gretzmacher, R.(1972): Die Wirkung der Hackfrucht.. In: Universität f. Bodenkultur Wien (Hrsg.): 100 Jahre Hochschule für Bodenkultur in Wien. 18.-19. Okt. 1972. Band 3: Vorträge der Studienrichtung Landwirtschaft, Studienzweig Pflanzenproduktion, Teil 1: Allgemeine Fachvorträge, 207-219
- Gretzmacher, R.(1970): Erfahrungen mit dr Kultur von Weinreben (Vitis vinifera L.) in Nährlösungen.. Die Bodenkultur, 21, 2,111-126

=== Lectures (Unpublished) ===
- Gretzmacher, R. (2004): The Republic South Africa., 18.02.2004, Kasetsart Universität, Bangkok, Thailand
- Gretzmacher, R. (2004): Worldwide agriculture - principles, development and comparison of influences from climate up to politics., 18.02.2004, Kasetsart Universität, Bangkok, Thailand
- Gretzmacher, R. (2003): Grundlagen und Entwicklung der Landwirtschaft in der 3. Welt. Vorlesung im Lehrgang für Akademische Orient-Studien and der Orient Akademie, 15.-17.05.2003, Wien, Österreich
- Gretzmacher, R. (2003): International agriculture with respect to geographic environment. Vorlesung, Sokrates/Ersamus-Dozentenmobilität, 25.09.2003, Süd-Böhmische Universität Budweis, Ceske Budejovice, Tschechien
- Owino, J., R. Gretzmacher (2002): Performance of Narrow Strips of Vetiver Grass (Vetiveria zizanioides) and Napier Grass (Pennisetum purpureum) as Barriers against Runoff and Soil Sediment Loss on a Clay Loam Soil (Andosol) in Kenya. Deutscher Tropentag, 9.-11. Oktober 2002, Universität Kassel, Witzenhausen, Deutschland
- Vollmann, J., T. Moritz, H. Wagentristl, P. Ruckenbauer, R. Gretzmacher (2001): Genetic improvement of oil content in camelina. Annual Meeting, Crop Science Society of America, 21.-25. Okt. 2001, Charlotte, NC, USA
- Gretzmacher, R. (2000): Introduction to the tropics, subtropics and agronomy.. Introduction to alpine agriculture, 21. und 22. September 2000, Agricultural College Hvanneyri, Iceland
- Gretzmacher, R. (2000): Pflanzenbau: Technologien für die chinesische Landwirtschaft.. China-Informations-tage an der Universität für Bodenkultur Wien, 30. Mai 2000, Wien
- Bozza, G., Gretzmacher, R., Vollmann, J. (1994): The influence of sunlight and heat on inoculation.. Poster, Technical Meeting of the FAO European Network on Soyabean, Padua/Italien, 23. September
- Gretzmacher, R., Schahbzian, N. (1994): Verbesserung der Eiweiß- und Ölversorgung im Iran durch Steigerung der Sojabohnenerträge mittels Optimierung der Inoculation mit Knöllchenbakterien und der organischen Düngung.. Endbericht Iran-Projekt Nr. 66, Kommission für Entwicklungsfragen bei der österreichischen Akademie der Wissenschaften
- Vollmann, J., Gruber, H., Hanifi-Moghaddam, K., Gretzmacher, R., Ruckenbauer, P. (1992): New ideas to improve the efficiency of hybridization in soybean.. In: Reproductive Biology and Plant Breeding, Book of Poster Abstracts, XIIIth EUCARPIA Congress, July 6–11, 1992, Angers, France, 307-308

== See also ==
- Food security
- Intensive farming
- Agricultural Production

== Further Study ==
- Bailey, A (2007). Crop genetic resources in European home gardens. Slovenia: Bioversity International. p. 86. ISBN 978-92-9043-810-6.
- IBSS (1994). International Bibliography of the Social Sciences: Economics 1994. British Library of Political and Economic Science: Routledge. p. 138. ISBN 978-0-415-12783-7.
- Saur (2007). Kurschners Deutscher Gelehrten-Kalender 21st Ed 3 Vol. Set. Germany: K. G. Saur Verlag. p. 1118. ISBN 978-3-598-23612-9.
- Verlag der O.A.W (1994). Österreichische Akademie der Wissenschaften. Almanach, Volume 145. Austria. p. 366.
- Wirtschafts-trend Zeitschriftenverlag (1989). Profil, Volume 20. Austria. p. 83.
- Verein für Geschichte der Stadt Wien (1974). Wiener Geschichtsblätter, Volume 29. Austria. pp. ii.
- Vandenhoeck & Ruprecht (1995). Bibliographie der Wirtschaftswissenschaften, Volume 87, Issue 1. Germany.
- Del Greco, A. (2007). Report of a Task Force on On-farm Conservation and Management. Slovenia: Bioversity International. p. 21. ISBN 9789290437987.
