= Sarwar Azam =

Bangladeshi military personnel

Shahid Sarwar Azam
- শহীদ সরোয়ার আজম
- Born: 31 December 1952 (age 73); Singra, East Bengal, Pakistan
- Spouse: Kamrun Nahar
- Military career
- Allegiance: Bangladesh
- Branch: Bangladesh Army; Bangladesh Rifles
- Service years: 1976–2006
- Rank: Colonel
- Unit: Corps of Engineers
- Commands: Sector Commander of BDR; CO of 37th Rifles Battalion; CO of 39th Rifles Battalion; CO of 29th Rifles Battalion; CO of 26th Engineers Regiment
- Conflicts: 2001 Bangladesh-India border clashes UNAMSIL
- Awards: See Below

Sahibzada Shahid Sarwar Azam FIEB (Urdu: محمد شاہد سرور اعظم شاه جہاں; Bengali: শহীদ সরোয়ার আজম or শহীদ সারোয়ার আজম; born Muhammad Shahid Sarwar Azam Shah Jahan on 31 December 1952, sometimes spelled Mohammad Shaheed Sarwar Azam) is the current head of the Singranatore family.

In his military career spanning three decades, he was in Deputy Command of the armed forces of the United Nations after the onset of the Sierra Leone Civil War in 2002 in collaboration with the Sierra Leone Republic Armed Forces and Police to provide support to the Special Court for Sierra Leone following the arrest of former Revolutionary United Front (RUF) leaders and Government minister on charges of war crimes, and enforce the Community Arms Collection and Development Program introduced by the United Nations Development Program (UNDP) in collaboration with the local paramount chiefs where neighbouring conflicts in Côte d'Ivoire (Ivory Coast) and Liberia had resulted in an influx of refugees in the area. His younger brother, a Lieutenant Colonel of the Bangladesh Army also served at the United Nations Mission in Sudan in 2005.

Following his service to the UN in West Africa, he commanded the Rajshahi and Khagrachari fronts of the Border Guard Bangladesh (then known as the Bangladesh Rifles) during clashes with the Banga Sena (Bengal Army) and Indian Border Security Force (BSF) in the North West and during the aftermath of the Shanti Bahini (Peace Army) operations in the South East. He was the first military officer of the Engineering Corps to be appointed as a Bangladesh Rifles Sector Commander in the history of the Bangladesh military and held the commands after the armed conflicts of 2001 but prior to the 2009 military massacre where all sector commanders, including both his incumbents were systematically shot and killed. In 2004, he held talks with the BSF of India protesting killings of unarmed people at the border, and pushing Indians in Bangladesh territory, smuggling, trespassing, drugs and arms trafficking between India and the People's Republic of Bangladesh. The same year, he presented a list of Bangladeshi fugitives in hiding in India in exchange for Indians hiding in Bangladesh. In 2005, along with General Jahangir Alam Chowdhury outright rejected the Indian High Commission claim of setting up border structures close to the zero line according to a former treaty. He then led the discussion to resolve this issues within the Indo-Bengali Treaty of 1975 with the Indian Forces.

== Early life and education ==
Born on New Year's Eve, 1952 in Malabare Mansion, Azam was first educated privately before being sent to Rajshahi Collegiate School and then to Jhenidah Cadet College, a military boarding school by his father. He was in the first graduating class of the academy in 1968. As a cadet he was interrogated by the occupying Pakistani Army during the Great Liberation War of 1971. He was initially set on attending College of Electrical and Mechanical Engineering and being a cadet at Pakistan Military Academy in Kakul. On 7 March 1971, he viewed more than ten thousand Bengali demonstrators forcing their way into the Jhenidah Cadet College in demonstration. His school principal, Lt Col Monzurur Rahman (a Bengali), and three teachers were shot and killed. After graduating from the Bangladesh Military Academy and being commissioned into the Engineers Corps of the newly formed Bangladesh Army in 1976, he graduated from BUET in 1979 with a Bachelor of Science degree in mechanical engineering.

=== Family ===
He is married to Dr. Kamrun Nahar and has a daughter Shahzia Sarwar Shazi and a son, Sanwar Azam Sunny. He is the third son of Gulbadan Begum of Natore and Shamez Uddin Ahmed and is the brother-in-law to MM Rahmatullah through his elder sister, Gole Afroz. He is also a grandson of Jalaluddin Mirza. By marriage, he is a brother-in-law of American author and architect Saleh Uddin and a Co-brother of Major Raihanul Abedin.

== Military career ==
=== Bangladesh Army ===
After being directly commissioned as a Lieutenant in the Army in May 1976, he served at Rangpur, Saidpur, Jessore, Mymensingh, Sylhet, Savar, Gazipur and Chittagong military units and brigades, among others till 2002.

As a Major, he was the Staff officer to Brigadier Hannan Shah in Chittagong, (later BNP politician, minister and Advisor to Khaleda Zia, the Prime Minister of Bangladesh) in 1979, before he was removed from the military by Lt. General Hussain Muhammad Ershad following the assassination of General Ziaur Rahman, the President of Bangladesh in 1981 at the Chittagong Circuit House.

=== United Nations ===
In 2002, Colonel Sarwar Azam became the Deputy Commander of the Bangladesh UN Sector in Sierra Leone in Africa. The United Nations Mission in Sierra Leone (UNAMSIL) was a United Nations peacekeeping operation in Sierra Leone from 1999 to 2005. It was created by the United Nations Security Council in October 1999 to help with the implementation of the Lomé Peace Accord, an agreement intended to end the Sierra Leonean civil war. UNAMSIL expanded in size several times in 2000 and 2001. It concluded its mandate at the end of 2005, the Security Council having declared that its mission was complete. The mandate was notable for authorising UNAMSIL to protect civilians under imminent threat of physical violence (albeit "within its capabilities and areas of deployment") – a return to a more proactive style of UN peacekeeping. Among others, its mission was to monitor adherence to the ceasefire in accordance with the ceasefire agreement (whose signing was witnessed by Jesse Jackson); and to provide support, as requested, to the elections, which are to be held in accordance with the present constitution of Sierra Leone

It was later revised to guard weapons, ammunition and other military equipment collected from ex-combatants and to assists in their subsequent disposal or destruction Upon withdrawal, the remaining staff in Freetown were transferred to United Nations Integrated Office in Sierra Leone (UNIOSIL). In early 2003 at Magburaka, as Deputy Commander of UNAMSIL's Sector Centre, Colonel Azam informed the Force Commander that in spite of the recent indictments by the Special Court for Sierra Leone of former Revolutionary United Front (RUF) leaders and a Government minister on war crimes charges, the current security situation in the area was "calm and stable."

He said there was no significant reaction to the indictments by local leaders, the army or the police but assured the Acting Force Commander that his troops would continue to monitor the situation. The peacekeepers are also providing security and transport to the staff of the Court as they continue their investigations. The Acting Force Commander was also briefed on the Community Arms Collection and Development Programme recently introduced under the supervision of the United Nations Development Program (UNDP) in collaboration with local paramount chiefs. Under the program, local communities are encouraged to hand over weapons at designated dropping points, particularly shotguns, that were not covered under the UNAMSIL disarmament process.

Colonel Azam commended the co-operation his troops were getting from the Republic of Sierra Leone Armed Forces and the Sierra Leone Police who are "quite active in maintaining law and order." According to Azam, conflicts in Côte d'Ivoire (Ivory Coast) and Liberia have resulted in an influx of refugees in the sector. In his statement, the Force Commander commended the sector commander for the good work his troops were carrying out in the sector, noting that communities were gradually accepting the authority of local security agencies deployed throughout the sector.

Azam's service ended in December 2003, and one of the two planes carrying the forces from Freetown, Sierra Leone crashed in Democratic Republic of the Congo killing 128 people and 15 peacekeepers from Bangladesh. Azam and other commanders boarded the second plane as the first had problems while on the ground.

=== Bangladesh Rifles (now known as Border Guard) ===
The 2001 Indian–Bangladeshi border conflict was a brief armed conflict in April 2001 between India and Bangladesh over the poorly marked international border between the countries. As of April 2011, it was the first and only such major conflict between the two countries who have maintained friendly relations since the 1971 Bangladesh Liberation War. The Partition of Bengal in 1947 left a poorly demarcated international border between India and Bangladesh (then-East Pakistan). Ownership of several villages on both sides of the de facto border were disputed and claimed by both countries. The dispute over the demarcation of the Indo-Bangladeshi border worsened due to the existence of over 190 enclaves.

One of the disputed areas was a small sliver of land near the village of Pyrdiwah which the Indian Border Security Force (BSF) had occupied since the 1971 liberation of Bangladesh. The village was one of the Indian exclaves near the border of Bangladesh with the Indian state of Meghalaya. Bangladesh claimed that the village was within its territory. Five battalions of the 19th division of the Bangladesh Army, with additional personnel from the Bangladesh Rifles (BDR), attacked the positions of India's Border Security Force at Pyrdiwah at 01:00 hours on 16 April 2001. India claimed that Bangladeshi troops overran and occupied the village, which was near the town of Dauki, and that Bangladeshi forces were holding more than 20 Indian soldiers hostage. However, Bangladesh insisted that Indian forces launched an early-morning attack on their posts in the frontier district of Kurigram, which lay on the border with the Indian state of Assam, on the morning of 16 April. Indian forces eventually responded but failed to retake the village. The combat remained limited to the border troops of the respective nations, though mortars were used in addition to automatic weapons fire. Between 10,000 and 20,000 villagers living in the area fled the fighting, with at least 17 suffering wounds. Several villages were destroyed or heavily damaged in the fighting. 16 Indian and 2 Bangladeshi troops died during the conflict. Top Indian border security sources claimed that the BDR personnel had retreated in the Meghalaya sector, while in the Assam sector, the Indian BSF had vacated positions seized from Bangladesh. Fresh clashes erupted along the India–Bangladesh border just hours after both sides voiced regret for the recent killings, but by midnight of 20 April firing had again stopped. An article reported that 6,000 Indian civilians had fled the region, and Indian government officials were attempting to convince villagers to return to their homes. The Indian BSF agreed to take back bodies of five of its soldiers at Rowmari sector, whilst the other 11–17 were classified as 'missing'. Bangladesh later agreed to return the dead Indian soldiers the next day. Upon examining the bodies of the dead personnel, India alleged that the BSF men were tortured before being shot dead. Three Bangladeshi soldiers were also killed: two during combat and another who died of wounds sustained during operations.

April 2001, Bangladesh's then Prime Minister Sheikh Hasina spoke to then-Prime Minister of India, Atal Bihari Vajpayee, and agreed to order a high-level investigation over the incident, especially the torture of BSF men. The two leaders spoke again a month later, and Hasina "expressed regrets" over the border skirmish. By July 2001, the two sides established joint working groups to establish the un-demarcated sections of the border. Officially, Bangladesh denied it had initiated hostilities. This was the first armed conflict between India and Bangladesh, two nations that had maintained friendly relations since Bengali independence in 1971. In parliamentary elections, the four-party right-wing alliance led by the Bangladesh Nationalist Party and Jamaat-e-Islami Bangladesh won a majority of 196 seats out of 300.

Bangladesh ordered no courts martial, suspensions, or transfers of any local commanders. Both sides desisted from any further hostilities and began border talks to discuss disputes along their 4,000-kilometre (2,500 mi) border. Relations were cooled down shortly afterwards. India later began constructing a fence along the entire length of the international border with Bangladesh. India is still in the process of constructing the Indo-Bangladeshi barrier. Bangladesh protested that construction of the fence within 150 yards of the border was a gross violation of the Indo-Bangladeshi Treaty of Friendship, Cooperation and Peace. The Bangladesh government also protested frequent BSF incursions into Bangladesh, and shootings which resulted in the deaths of Bangladeshi citizens inside Bangladeshi territory. In a news conference in August 2008, it was stated that 59 people had been killed (34 Bangladeshis, 21 Indians, rest unidentified) trying to cross the border illegally during the prior six months.

The Banga Sena, (translated as the Bengal Army) a separatist Hindu organisation advocated formation of a separate homeland for Bengali Hindus in Bangladesh. The group is led by Kalidas Baidya. Major General Jahangir Alam Chowdhury, the Director General of the Bangladesh Rifles (BDR), in a talk with the Director General of the Border Security Force (BSF) Ajay Raj Sharma in 2004 said that the extremist group Banga Sena was carrying out terrorist and secessionist activities against Bangladesh from its bases in the Indian state of West Bengal. Khodeza Begum in an article in the Global Politician accused India of helping to organise the Banga Sena. In March 2006, a senior official of the home ministry of Bangladesh expressed concern over the anti-Bangladesh activities by the Banga Sena. Regarding this he added that Bangladesh wants a peaceful border with neighbouring India and the situation has vastly improved following coordinated border patrolling by the both countries. A Bangladeshi official stated that the organisation is a "threat to the sovereignty of Bangladesh".

More than 400 members of the Banga Sena were arrested in India on 18 February 2003 for trying to cross over into Bangladesh from the district of North 24 Parganas in southern West Bengal. According to police sources, activists belonging to the organisation began gathering at the Indo-Bangladesh border at Halencha, North 24 Parganas in the jurisdiction of the Bagda police station since morning that day.

In January 2004, the director general of the Bangladesh Rifles gave a list of the camps of the remaining Shanti Bahni elements in the North-East Indian states of Tripura and Assam and in adjoining Indian provinces to the director general of the Border Security Force. The list documented that the Banga Sena, along with several other groups, carried out communal tension and separatist activities against Bangladesh from West Bengal. Indian Foreign Secretary said that India will co-operate in tackling the Banga Sena and other insurgent groups. In September 2007, the representatives of two NGOs, Diphu Citizen Peace Forum and Karbi Human Rights Watch, in the Karbi Anglong District of Assam said that the Banga Sena was involved in extortion and it could pose a threat to the peace in the region. Regarding the activities of the Banga Sena, the Foreign Secretary of Bangladesh Shamsher Mobin Chowdhury made it clear that his country will not tolerate any statement or move against its territory or sovereignty. The All India Minority Forum, an organisation for religious minorities in India, also expressed concern over this organisation.

From 2004 to 2005 he led the Bangladesh Border Guard with talks against the Indian BSF and outright rejected the interpretation of Delhi, Indian capital on behalf of the government of Bangladesh on the former's translation of the Indo-Bangladesh border treaty of 1975. In it he protested the record amount of killings of innocent citizens by Indian military, border tension, smuggling, trespassing, drugs and arms trafficking. A large amount of smuggling occurs in the border area. Livestock, Food items and drugs are smuggled from India into Bangladesh. Bangladeshi immigrants also cross the border to find jobs in India. India's BSF maintains a shoot-at-sight policy for any illegal entrants. Each year hundreds of Bangladeshis lose their lives at the hand of BSF while trying to cross the border. The border has also witnessed occasional skirmishes between BSF and BDR such as in 2001.

BSF has often been accused by Bangladesh government of incursions into Bangladesh territory, and indiscriminate shooting of civilians along the India-Bangladesh borders. This was in retaliation to massive illegal immigration from Bangladesh into India, for which the Indo-Bangladeshi Barrier is presently underway In a news conference in August 2008, Indian BSF officials admitted that they killed 59 illegals (34 Bangladeshis, 21 Indians, rest unidentified) who were trying to cross the border during the prior six months. Bangladeshi media accused the BSF of abducting 5 Bangladeshi children, aged between 8 and 15, from the Haripur Upazila in Thakurgaon District of Bangladesh, in 2010. The children were setting fishing nets near the border. In 2010, Human Rights Watch has accused the Border Security Force of indiscriminate killings. BSF allegedly killed a 15 years old Bangladeshi girl on 7 January 2011 while she and her father was climbing the Indo-Bangladeshi barrier using a ladder.

In 2010, Human Rights Watch (HRW) issued an 81-page report which detailed hundreds of abuses by the BSF. The report was compiled from interviews with victims of BSF shootings, witnesses and members of the BSF and its Bangladeshi counterpart. The report alleged that over 900 Bangladeshi citizens have been killed in the 2000s (decade) by the BSF. According to HRW, while most of them were killed when they crossed into Indian territory for indulging in cattle rustling or other smuggling activities, many were also killed in BSF's indiscriminate firing across the border.

In September 2011, the Prime Ministers of the two countries (Manmohan Singh of India and Sheikh Hasina of Bangladesh) signed an accord on border demarcation and exchange of adversely held enclaves. Under this agreement, the enclave residents may continue residing at their present location or move to the country of their choice.

== Later life and civilian career ==
In 2009, Azam became the director of engineering (and then chief operating officer) for Jamuna Group's newly designed Jamuna Future Park, located in the business centre of Dhaka, the capital of Bangladesh, minutes away from the International Airport and other major landmarks. He oversaw the building and management of the largest mall and entertainment district in South Asia. As one of the largest shopping malls in the world, with a gross leasable area of over 4 million and a total area of over 5 million square feet, he constructed the 9-floor level structure on 33 acres, surrounded by an additional 16 acres of landscaping.

With more than a 150 combined elevators and escalators, it is equipped with a banquet hall for 500 people, a health club with a spa and sauna for 2,000 people, a children's theme park for 2,500 children in addition to 7 Cineplex theatres and a 22 lane bowling alley with around 20,000 ton unit by Dunham Bush would be powered by the Rolls-Royce engines, rated at around 40MW. The six, 16 cylinder, gas fuelled Rolls-Royce Bergen B35:40 gas engines provides power in addition to automatic powered generator plant supplying 45MW self-substation on the premises of the structure which also built a 5,000-lot automated parking structure below the level of the mall is surrounded by 900-room five star hotel, a TV Channel station, a hospital and a mosque. He further said:

It will be a great hub for business and entertainment, as well as stand as a symbol of prestige, progress and economic development of the area, ... It is the largest of its kind in the region.

== Titles, rank and decorations ==
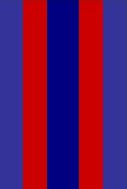
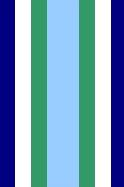

=== Medals and decorations ===
- (Bangladesh) 1986: Prothom Jesthatha Padak (Decade Service)
- (Bangladesh) 1991: Sangsad Padak(1991 National Election Medal)
- (Bangladesh) 1996: Sangsad Padak (1996 National Election Medal)
- 1996: Pochishtomo Padak (Silver Jubilee Medal)
- (Bangladesh) 1996: Ditiyo Jesthatha Padak (Two Decade Service)
- 1997: BDR Padak (Rifles Medal)
- 1999: Gurnijhar Padak (Cyclone Relief Medal)
- (United Nations) 2004: UN Medal (UNAMSIL)
- (Bangladesh) 2006: Tritio Jesthatha Padak (25 Years Service)

=== Rank and titles ===
- 1952–1966: Sahibzada Muhammad S. Sarwar Azam Shah Jahan
- 1966–1970: Cadet Muhammad Sarwar Azam (Cadet at JCC)
- 1970–1975: Gentleman Cadet M S Azam (Training at BUET)
- 1976–1977: Officer Cadet Muhammad Sarwar Azam, at BMA
- 1977–1978: Lieutenant Muhammad Sarwar Azam
- 1978–1981: Captain Muhammad Sarwar Azam
- 1981–1989: Major Muhammad Sarwar Azam
- 1990–2001: Lieutenant Colonel Muhammad Sarwar Azam
- 2001–2006: Colonel Muhammad Sarwar Azam
- 2006– : Colonel Sahibzada Muhammad Sarwar Azam Retd

== See also ==
- Vice Admiral Sarwar Jahan Nizam
- Bangladesh–India border
- 2001 Indian–Bangladeshi border conflict
