= Painter Kazi Anowar Hossain Award =

Biannual Bangladeshi painting award

Painter Kazi Anowar Hossain
- Location: Dhaka, Bangladesh
- Country: Bangladesh
- Presented by: Bangladesh
- Hosted by: Bangladesh Shilpakala Academy
- First award: 2019
- Final award: Present

The Painter Kazi Anowar Hossain Award (Bengali: চিত্রশিল্পী কাজী আনোয়ার হোসেন পুরস্কার) was officially launched at the 23rd National Fine Art Exhibition, Bangladesh in 2019. This award is generally given every two years. Bangladesh's national academy of Art launched this award in memory of this great painter.

== History ==
In the 23rd National Fine Art Exhibition-2019, for the first time, this award was given in the name of Ekushey Padak winning painter Kazi Anowar Hossain. This ceremony was held at the National Gallery of Shilpakala Academy, Dhaka. Beside of inaugurating the exhibition, HT Imam, Political Adviser of the Prime Minister, handed over the prizes to the winning artists. Former Finance Minister Abul Maal Abdul Muhith, Cultural Minister K. M. Khalid and reputed painter Monirul Islam were also present there.

== Prize ==
The reward of this award is a padak (medal), a reputation certificate and a check price of 50 thousand taka.

== List of award recipients ==
The award has been given only one time until now. For the first time, Pollob Rana Parves won the award. She portrayed the many obstacles of women in one painting. Her painting Reflection-4 won the award.

== See also ==
- National Information and Communication Technology Awards
