= Kazi Sabyasachi =

Bengali elocutionist

- কাজী সব্যসাচী
- Born: 9 October 1928; Calcutta, Bengal Presidency, British India
- Died: 2 March 1979 (aged 50); Dacca, Bangladesh
- Occupation: Recitation
- Spouses: Uma Kazi
- Children: Khilkhil Kazi; Mistee Kazi; Babul Kazi
- Parents: Kazi Nazrul Islam (father); Pramila Devi (mother)
- Family: Kazi family of Churulia

Kazi Sabyasachi (9 October 1928 – 2 March 1979) was a Bengali elocutionist. He was the third son of the national poet of Bangladesh, Kazi Nazrul Islam.

Sabyasachi came to fame in the 1960s and '70s as a reciter. In 1966, he became the first to record the recitation of Bidrohi, a poem by Nazrul Islam.

== Early life and family ==
Sabyasachi was born on 9 October 1928 to Nazrul Islam and Pramila Devi. His family traced their origins to the Burdwan district in West Bengal. Sabyasachi had three brothers, Krishna Mohammad (d. 1924), Arindam Khaled Bulbul (d. 1929), and Kazi Aniruddha (d. 1974). Sabyasachi was married to Uma Kazi (d. 2020). Together they had two daughters, Khilkhil Kazi and Mistee Kazi, and, a son, Babul Kazi (d. 2025).

== Legacy ==
In 2012, the Ministry of Cultural Affairs of Bangladesh initiated the Kazi Sabyasachi Memorial Award for two elocutionists - one from Bangladesh and one from India. Recipients of the award include: 2012 - Kazi Abu Zafar Siddique; 2016 - Soumitra Chatterjee and Kazi Arif.
