= Kazi Kaniz Sultana =

Bangladeshi politician

- কাজী কানিজ সুলতানা

Member of Bangladesh Parliament
- In office 2019–2024

Personal details
- Born: 2 January 1961 (age 65) Moukaran, Patuakhali
- Party: Bangladesh Awami League
- Education: M.A
- Occupation: Social work & politics

Kazi Kaniz Sultana is a Bangladesh Awami League politician and a member of the Bangladesh Parliament from a reserved seat.

== Career ==
Sultana was elected to parliament from reserved seat as a Bangladesh Awami League candidate in 2019.

In May 2025, a travel ban was issued against Sultana and her two sons.
