= Kairan Quazi =

Bangladeshi-American software engineer (born 2009)

- কায়রান কাজী
- Born: 27 January 2009 (age 17); Pleasanton, California, U.S.
- Citizenship: American
- Education: Santa Clara University
- Occupation: Computer engineering
- Employer: Citadel Securities

Kairan Quazi (Bengali: কায়রান কাজী; born 27 January 2009) is an American software engineer working at the American aerospace manufacturer company SpaceX. At age 14, he graduated from the Santa Clara University School of Engineering in 2023, becoming the university's youngest graduate. He was recruited by SpaceX in June 2023 to work at Starlink, the company's satellite internet team. He has been described in media as a precocious talent.

== Early life and family ==
Kairan was born in Pleasanton, California to Bangladeshi parents Mustahid Quazi and Jullia Quazi née Chowdhury. He belongs to a family of Bengali Muslims from Manikganj. In Bangladesh, his father was a chemical engineer and his mother was a Wall Street executive. At age 2, his intellectual and emotional intelligence were assessed by doctors as highly advanced. He first entered Mensa International and became a member of the Davidson Institute Young Scholar.

== College education ==
Kairan was advised by his family doctor and school teachers to enroll in college while still in third grade. He had already developed an interest in calculus and organic chemistry, subjects not available in the school's curriculum. His psychologist assessed him as "an outlier among outliers," and recommended that Kairan was ready for college. Psychologist Dan Peters suggested that he join the Helios School, a private school for gifted children. At age nine, in 2018, he simultaneously entered the Helios School and the Las Positas Community College, where he studied mathematics and chemistry, and received his associate degree in science. In 2018, he completed California's high school equivalency exam, a requisite for full college enrolment. At Las Positas, he became the youngest student and tutor. In 2019 he was accepted by Lama Nachman, director of the Intelligent Systems Research Lab at Intel for an internship. Kairan said his experience with Nachman "changed everything". In 2020, he obtained Associate of Science degree in mathematics from Las Positas Community College.

In 2020, at age 11, Quazi transferred to Santa Clara University (SCU) and studied computer science and engineering. In 2022, he completed an internship at a cyber intelligence firm, Blackbird.AI. Between 2021 and 2023, he was elected senator in the Associated Student Government of the university. With a thesis titled ACAT 2.0: An AI Transformer-Based Approach to Predictive Speech Generation, he graduated on 17 June 2023. With a degree in software engineering, Kairan became the youngest student to ever graduate from Santa Clara University.

== Career ==
By February 2023, Kairan had received three employment offers. In April 2023, Quazi announced on Instagram that he was ready for a major job interview. Several companies rejected his applications, but SpaceX offered him a position. His parents "prepared him for disappointment", as his mother took him to Seattle for the interview. The company announced his appointment on 13 June, posting on Twitter: "SpaceX hires the best, brightest and smartest engineers in the world, even a 14-year-old by the name of Kairan Quazi, who will start his new job on SpaceX's Starlink team on July 31." He moved to Redmond with his mother in July 2023.

When Kairan announced his new appointment on LinkedIn, saying, "Next stop: Space X!", the professional online platform soon deleted his account. LinkedIn requires users to be 16 years of age. It informed Kairan that he would be welcome to join when he turned 16. Kairan responded by remarking the situation "illogical, primitive nonsense" as he was already employed in a profession. LinkedIn restored his account in March 2025.

In August 2025, at age 16, Quazi was hired by Citadel Securities as a quant developer in New York City.
