= Raihanul Abedin =

Bangladeshi military officer

- রাইহানুল আবেদিন

Managing Director (Chief) of the Dhaka WASA
- In office 2007–2009
- President: Iajuddin Ahmed

Director of Energy Treaties Bangladesh Oil, Gas and Mineral Corporation
- In office 2003–2007
- President: Iajuddin Ahmed
- Prime Minister: Khaleda Zia

Personal details
- Born: 1 July 1952 (age 74)
- Spouse: Shamsun Nahar Abedin
- Children: 3
- Education: Bangladesh University of Engineering and Technology
- Occupation: Military officer and engineer

Military service
- Allegiance: Bangladesh
- Branch/service: Bangladesh Army
- Years of service: 1973–1984
- Rank: Major
- Unit: East Bengal Regiment
- Commands: 2IC of 9th East Bengal Regiment
- Battles/wars: Bangladesh Liberation War; Chittagong Hill Tracts Conflict

Major Muhammad Raihanul Abedin (Bengali: মোহাম্মদ রাইহানুল আবেদিন; born 1 July 1952) is a former military officer of the Bangladesh Army and an energy, power, and utilities engineer. He was the former PSC director of the Bangladesh Oil, Gas and Mineral Corporation. Working on behalf of the government of Bangladesh, he oversaw all energy production treaties with various foreign energy companies, including Enron Corporation, Niko Resources, and Tullow Oil.

Abedin initiated the $230 million deal with Unocal Corporation (now Chevron Corporation) in 2004, after getting approval from Prime Minister Khaleda Zia. He was also a senior national committee member for the International Clean Cities program of the United States Department of Energy in Bangladesh. Bangladesh was getting very polluted due to extreme use of fuels. In 2001, Abedin was the first to initiate the national plan to decrease the use of liquid fuels by introducing natural gas conversion. He thought if cars could be converted to use cooking gas instead of rather harmful fuels, the carbon emission would decrease exponentially. He was given the permission by the Prime Minister Khaleda Zia to carry out his plans. As a result, the Asian Development Bank funded his scheme, and today more than 80% of Bangladeshi vehicles are run on gas, which has lessened pollution significantly.

Abedin then served as the managing director of Water Supply and Sewerage System operations of the government of Bangladesh during the military-supported government of Bangladesh in 2007. He was forced to resign once the ruling party took power in the 2009 national elections when the newly formed government sued top officials of the old regime. Abedin, during whose time WASA was expanded from six to 11 zones, was called in the Local Government Rural Development and Cooperatives (LGRD) Ministry in April 2009 and asked to resign immediately due to nepotism, according to the new Government. Inquiries later suggested that it was just a scheme for him to abandon his post as the head of Dhaka WASA. As a former high official of state-owned Rupantarita Prakritik Gas Company Limited, (RPGCL) Abedin was sued twice by the government on his birthday in 2008. The allegations were, however, false. RPGCL claimed that there was a corruption of BDT 15.3 million; however, the company RPGCL did not have an overall worth of BDT 10 million (around US$120,000) at that time, so the allegations weren't sensible.

== Personal background ==
Abedin was born in East Pakistan to a family of dewans in Comilla, who were chief ministers to the kings of Tripura in their capital at Comilla. He attended the Bangladesh University of Engineering and Technology (then known as East Pakistan University of Engineering and Technology), where he studied mechanical engineering, graduating in 1970. He was an Army Scholar. During his time in BUET, he was the president of Awami League Chatro League. He also led the Choi Dofa Andalon from the Bangladesh University of Engineering and Technology. He married Shamsun Nahar, a member of the Munshibari family of Comilla. Nahar was the older sister of authors Kamrun Nahar and Saleh Uddin. He has two daughters, Shehnaz Raihan Abedin (Jenny) and Nowrin Raihan Abedin, and a son, Mohammad Rafatul Abedin (Rafat).

=== Military background ===
In March 1973, Abedin was commissioned in the East Pakistan Army, then later the newly formed Bangladesh Army, where he served alongside Sheikh Kamal, son of former President Sheikh Mujibur Rahman of Bangladesh. In February 1984, he retired from the military, ranked as a major, to work in the private sector.

== Professional background ==
=== Occidental Petroleum and Unocal (Chevron) ===
Abedin personally initiated the $230 million (£123.9m) deal with Unocal Corporation (now Chevron Corporation) in 2004, on behalf of Bangladesh, after getting approval from the Prime Minister Khaleda Zia. This was at the Bibiyana field, which was located roughly around 180 miles north-east of the capital, Dhaka, and had a reserve of 2.4 trillion cubic feet of gas; it was found by Unocal in 1998. When asked about the 1997 blowout of the Magurchhara gas field, caused by Occidental Petroleum (later taken over by Chevron) and the resulting $6.12 billion suit against Chevron Corporation (of which only TK 380,000,000 was paid in damages), and why nothing was done about it, he said, "Ask the government". He also received objection letters from Tullow Oil when they objected to the asle of Chevron Texaco interests to Niko Resources and the government of Bangladesh.

=== Niko Resources ===
Between 2003 and 2006, Niko Resources was possibly involved in a corruption scandal involving the $750 million Tengratila and Feni gas fields in Bangladesh (the company accidentally caused an explosion, initially refused to pay for damages, and gave the minister responsible for overseeing compensation claims an expensive vehicle; Niko eventually did compensate the 620 affected families). Investigations into corruption allegations were made by the Royal Canadian Mounted Police in January 2009. Blowouts or failures of equipment are generally out of human control and scope. Most planned and prepared operations can fail against responses from Mother Nature.

In an attempt to blackmail the government of Bangladesh, Niko Resources suspended gas supply from the Feni gas field. Abedin sharply reacted by saying that they (Petrobangla under Bangladesh) might be constrained to take serious steps under the laws of Bangladesh. Abedin formally claimed compensation from Niko Resources, after both Begum Khaleda Zia, the prime minister of Bangladesh, and the energy advisor approved it. In his letter, Abedin outlined Niko's duty to supply three billion cubic feet (BCF) of gas free of cost for burning the same amount of gas in Tengratila and also compensate Petrobangla for another 5.89 BCF of gas burnt at the sub-surface level. The letter also sought Tk 840 million as compensation for damage to the environment, after Niko paid Tk 25 million to the local people. Later, Abedin met with the president and CEO of Niko Resources at the Energy Division meeting along with the energy secretary to resolve pending issues.

=== Rexwood-Oakland ===
Petrobangla was later allegedly involved in a non-bid negotiation with the US-based joint venture of Oakland-Rexwood, the latter stating that it would invest $60 million.

In 1998 and 1999, Enron Corporation was also selected for the blocks alongside Oakland, where Enron proposed an 80 percent share for themselves, and the rest for Oakland. The High Court of Bangladesh placed a ban on signing any production sharing agreement with any international oil company in December 2001, the same year that Enron Corporation went bankrupt for the Enron scandal. Production sharing agreement head Abedin outright rejected the notion, saying it was just a visit to the National Energy Sector, adding that they did not have a specific proposal. The Oakland-Rexwood blocks were later operated by Tullow Oil.

=== Water Board Authority and Development ===
After Petrobangla, Abedin was made the managing director of the Dhaka Water and Sewerage Authority (WASA) by the military-backed government of Bangladesh. He was given charge of the sector when ammonia and other impurity concentrations were severely high, which resulted in his taking the initiative to set up a pre-treatment plant for controlling the ammonia concentration. It was to be supervised by the Danish International Development Agency of the Ministry of Foreign Affairs of the Kingdom of Denmark and funded by the Asian Development Bank. He also talked about the World Bank-funded sewage treatment facility that improves water conditions.

The national board was already on the deep end of the water shortage, by at least 350 million litres, with the demand for the metropolitan capital of Dhaka being around 2 billion L. The national electricity crisis of the power grid was a major problem, as due to low voltage and frequent blackouts, maximum capacity could not be delivered. Raihanul Abedin was shocked by the previous paper works. Dhaka had a population of over 6 million, but Dhaka WASA had only 150 thousand customers. This proved why Dhaka WASA had been suffering from major losses in revenue since the beginning of time. Abedin took that into mind and founded a team that will go from house to house and inquire about their water supplies. By the time Abedin resigned from his post, Dhaka WASA's revenue went up by almost 300% and for the first time in the history of Dhaka WASA, it was a profitable organisation. There were many complaints that there wasn't sufficient water to fulfill the basic demands of the public of Dhaka, so Abedin devised a plan to construct another water treatment plant. After hearing negative comments from many experienced and influential people, such as "no one could do it in the last 20 years and no one can do it now, just relax and let things be as it is", Abedin took nothing into importance and devised a plan to get the job done. He contacted the World Bank for funds, and after the approval came from the World Bank, he gained the approval of the chief advisor. After three years the plans were passed; the construction for the new phase is currently under way. Abedin's dream to fulfill the demands of the public is actually coming true. He was asked by a journalist whether he would mind if his name wouldn't be mentioned in this project, and he replied kindly, "I did this for the good of the public, I just did my job, and seeing the public pleased is all I could ever want. Cutting a red ribbon is not a big deal".

Health issues became a concern, once researchers and studies found that various chemical concentrations were found to be ten times higher than the standards set by the World Health Organization. This, according to the board, was due to the disposal of industrial effluents that no government board monitored regularly at the time.

In 2008, the online billing system was introduced for the utility board, and it heralded mixed signals from the citizens, mainly because of spotty Internet services, and in 2009, WASA increased the water tariff by 20 percent, only a month after a five percent increase in tariff. He said that it was due to frequent power outages, which is why pumps have to be often run by generators, which is contributing to a rise in water-lifting cost.

By mid 2009, the water crisis was so large and widespread, that WASA decided to transport tanks of water on trucks to major areas of the capital. Earlier the same month, he said that "due to dependence on deep tube wells, water layers in the city are dropping around three metres a year on average" about the excessive use of underground water of the capital through around a thousand illegal deep tube wells, and filling up of low-lying land, canals and water bodies are causing the underground water level to drop alarmingly. Various researchers say that this could put the citizens in a severe water crisis in the future and also cause land to subside. As a result, the capital braced for one of their history's worst waterlogging problems, which Abedin believed resulted from unauthorised buildings being built on land filled up from ponds and lakes. He also brought attention to more than 100,000 illegal links in the national water supply network, which costs the nation around Tk 350 million a year.

==== Oliver Twist – SWAT fiasco ====
On 29 July, Abedin filed the case with Gulshan Police Station after a burglary at his house in Gulshan during which thieves stole a laptop, three digital cameras, and two cell phone sets. Given his prominence, instead of regular police officers, the elite SWAT team followed the leads in the case. The investigation led to the discovery of a network of young burglars who were street urchins. The media reported that this case was like that of Oliver Twist- Charles Dickens's noted work.

==== Resignation ====
On 8 April 2009, Abedin resigned from his position, and a joint secretary from the Ministry of Local Government Rural Development (LGRD) of Bangladesh was a temporary replacement for him, before the newly elected government chose another suitor.

The new government filed a case that had Abedin allegedly occupying a state palatial residence, corruption and nepotism in appointment, promotion, and transfer; unauthorised use of various official cars; and use of staff for personal purposes. He also allegedly hired 331 employees with bribes, all from his ancestral region, Comilla. In addition, two deputy managing directors out of four, two additional chief engineers, two out of ten superintending engineers, and most of those on the muster roll were also from Comilla. It was later discovered that allegations regarding promoting or hiring employees from his ancestral region were decided by the WASA board. He was blamed for living in the "WASA chairman House" located in Gulshan. He claimed that the house was meant for the CEO of Dhaka WASA, who was the managing director. He said that the house was built in the late 80s and early 90s, and at that time the house was named WASA chairman House and the post of managing director was called chairman. Upon request from the World Bank and various other foreign organisations, the name was changed to managing director. He said, "there is also a post called Board chairman but it is not to be confused with the CEO".

In response, Abedin said that according to the WASA Act of 1996, he is entitled to live in the palatial complex, as he took initiatives during the caretaker government to retrieve a six-bigha palatial house of WASA in Gulshan, which had been rented out to people without any legal authority. "A government residential house cannot be rented out," he added.

After Abedin resigned, the charges disappeared. He concluded by saying, "A certain group influenced some of media people to publish baseless reports about me with a malicious intention."
