= Kazi Hasibul Haque =

Bangladeshi cricketer (born 1986)

Kazi Hasibul Haque (born 27 October 1986 in Khulna) is a Bangladeshi former first-class cricketer active 2001–2005 who played for Khulna Division, Sylhet Division and Bangladesh Under-19s. He was a right-handed batsman and a wicket-keeper.
