= Kazi family of Churulia =

Cultural family in Bangladesh and India

Kazi family কাজী পরিবার
- Family
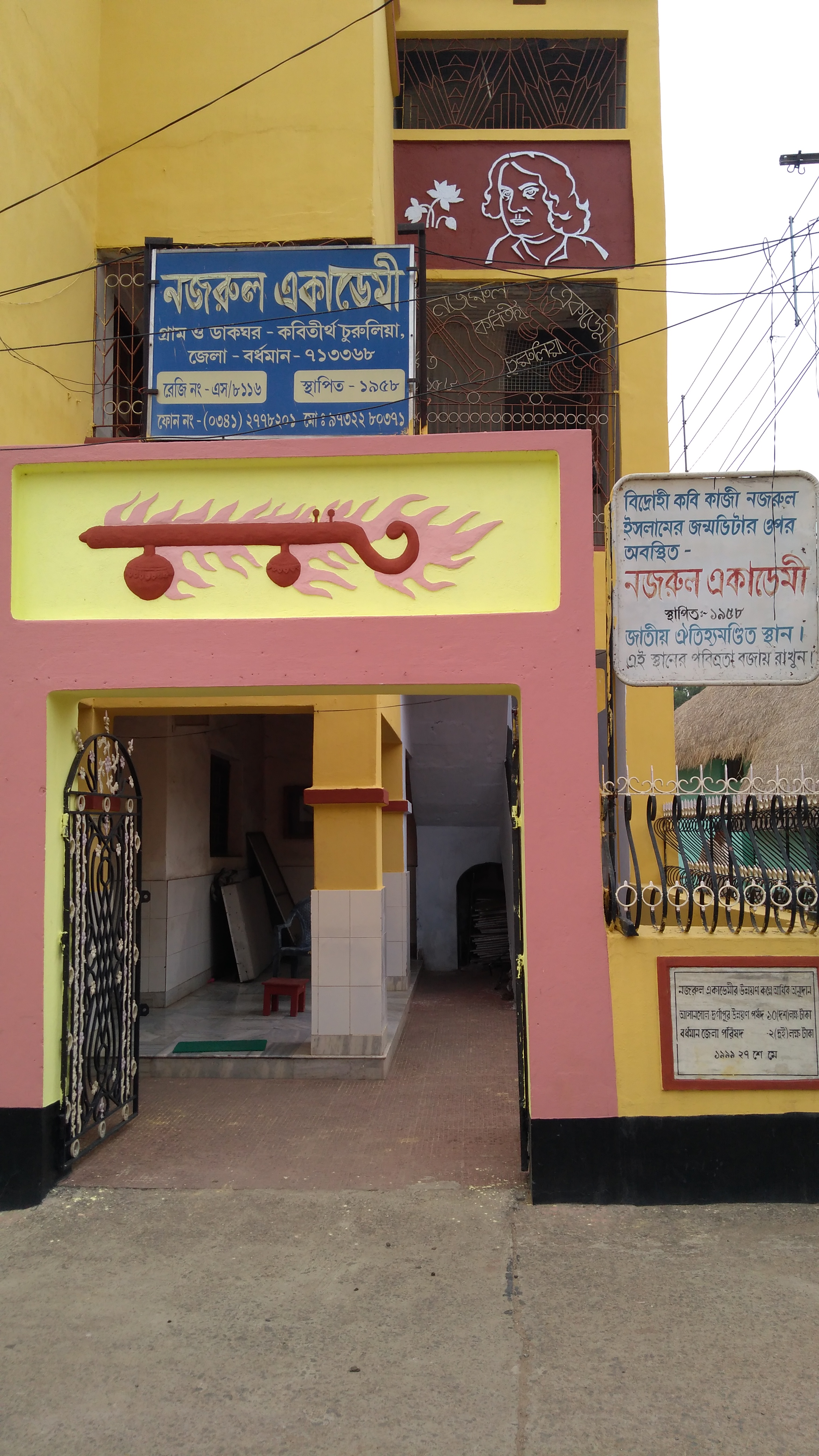
- Nazrul Academy, Churulia, where the Kazi family's house was formerly located
- Country: India, Bangladesh
- Current region: Bengal
- Origin: Churulia
- Founded: c. 1800
- Founder: Kazi Khebratullah
- Current head: Khilkhil Kazi
- Traditions: Sunni Islam

Kazi family is a cultural family of the Indian subcontinent. Originating from Churulia in present-day West Bengal, India, the history of this family spans approximately two hundred years. Many members of this family have been prominent figures in the fields of commerce, literature, and music.

== Origins ==
Around the 12th–13th centuries, a Sufi folk-figure named Syed Mohammad Islam migrated from Baghdad of the Abbasid Caliphate to Patna in the eastern region of the Delhi Sultanate. He later moved to Churulia and settled there permanently. In the 17th century, the region became part of the Mughal Empire. When Emperor Shah Jahan sought to reward Qazi Ghulam Naqshband, a descendant of Syed Mohammad Islam, with immovable property in recognition of his knowledge and character, Naqshband refused to accept the grant without paying revenue. As a result, the emperor declared the property rent-free by incorporating it into an ayma taluk. Consequently, Naqshband’s descendant Kazi Khebratullah became a wealthy figure in Churulia. Khebratullah was a religious leader who was proficient in Arabic, Urdu, and Persian. According to historians, the Kazi family originated from him. Of his four sons, Kazi Ghulam Hossain had two sons. One of them, Kazi Aminullah, managed the family property in Churulia. During the period of Company-ruled India, around 1847 CE, Aminullah's only son Kazi Fakir Ahmed was born; he was orphaned at an early age. After his father’s death, Fakir moved with his uncle Najibullah to the nearby Chaibasa, his uncle's workplace. However, when his uncle also died soon afterward, Fakir returned to Churulia and was unable to continue his education. After the death of Fakir's first wife, he married Zahida Biwi of Bhuri village, with whom he had three children, including Kazi Nazrul Islam. Kazi Fakir Ahmed died in 1907. Poet Kazi Nazrul Islam married Nargis Khanam of Comilla in 1921. However, when a condition of compulsory residence in Comilla was imposed, Nazrul left his first wife and departed. In 1924, he married Ashalata Sengupta of Comilla, who later became known as Pramila Kazi. The couple had four sons, two of whom died young. After Bangladesh gained independence from Pakistan in 1971, Kazi Nazrul Islam and his family were brought to Dhaka in 1972 at the initiative of the country's founding prime minister Sheikh Mujibur Rahman. Kazi Nazrul Islam died in Dhaka, Bangladesh, in 1976. Subsequently, the family of his son Kazi Sabyasachi remained in Dhaka. According to a 2016 report, this branch of the Kazi family has been residing in Dhaka for three generations. Nazrul's son Kazi Aniruddha remained behind in Kolkata, India, where his family established permanent residence. Meanwhile, the family of Nazrul's younger brother Kazi Ali Hossain continues to reside in Churulia, India.

== History ==
When the Bangladesh Liberation War began in 1971, the government of Pakistan stopped Nazrul’s pension. At that time, the Provisional Government of Bangladesh, formed in April with rebels from East Pakistan, announced a pension for Nazrul. In September of the same year, when the government resumed the pension, Nazrul's family rejected it in protest against the Bangladesh genocide. Disputes and divisions arose within the Kazi family regarding the final phase of Kazi Nazrul Islam's life. According to one faction of the family, Nazrul was neglected in Bangladesh, and despite the belief that he should have been sent to India to live peacefully in his final years, the Government of Bangladesh did not allow him to be sent there in order to claim him as a national asset. Another faction of the family, however, maintains that Nazrul was cared for and treated with dignity in Bangladesh. In 2011, after the Trinamool Congress state government came to power in West Bengal, India, an initiative was taken to establish a Nazrul Academy in Kolkata. However, the Kazi family expressed dissatisfaction over the political mudslinging that emerged around the initiative. In 2020, the Kazi family expressed disappointment that, despite government announcements, Kazi Nazrul Islam had not been officially recognized as the National Poet of Bangladesh through a government gazette, and they called for such recognition via gazette notification. Four years later, Nazrul was officially recognized as the National Poet through a government gazette. In 2021, on the occasion of Nazrul Jayanti, mobile service company Robi posted a tribute on its Facebook page featuring an image of Rabindranath Tagore; the post was later removed. However, the post quickly went viral, after which Khilkhil Kazi, representing the Kazi family, announced plans to file a lawsuit against the company. He also stated that legal action would be taken in the near future against the unauthorized commercial use of Nazrul Geeti. In the Hindi film Pippa, released in 2023, the song "Karar Oi Louho Kopat" by Kazi Nazrul Islam was included under the musical direction of A. R. Rahman. However, allegations arose that Rahman’s musical arrangement distorted the song. Family member Anirban Kazi stated that although his mother Kalyani Kazi had granted permission for the song's use, she had asked to hear the modified version before its release when the film team sought to recreate it. The team, however, did not play the song for her prior to release. On the other hand, other members of the family accused Anirban of selling the song's rights without informing them and expressed anger over the matter, threatening legal action against both Anirban and the film team. In 2025, poet and political activist Osman Hadi was buried in Dhaka at the Mausoleum of Kazi Nazrul Islam. Members of the Kazi family residing in India described the selection of this site for Hadi's burial as unethical. They expressed concern that Nazrul's tomb might not remain there in the future.

== Members ==
=== Kazi Fakir Ahmad ===
Kazi Fakir Ahmad was born around 1847. He was the son of Kazi Aminullah. By profession, he was a deed writer. He was addicted to gambling, and as a result, he lost most of his property after being defeated by the merchant Mahananda Ash. He had two wives. From his first wife, Syeda Khatun, he had one daughter. From his second wife, Zaheda Khatun, he had three sons and one daughter. Fakir died in 1908.

=== Kazi Nazrul Islam ===
Kazi Nazrul Islam joined the British Indian Army as a soldier in the 49th Bengali Regiment and rose to the rank of Havildar. Alongside this, he devoted himself to literary pursuits. His literary works were published in various newspapers in Kolkata. After the regiment was disbanded, he worked as a journalist. He gained prominence through the poem Bidrohi (The Rebel). Later, he joined the Indian National Congress (INC) and played a major role in establishing its affiliated organization, the Labour Swaraj Party. In 1926, he contested the Bengal Legislative Council election and was defeated. In 1940, he became the editor of the daily newspaper Nabajug. From two years later until his death in 1976, he suffered from a neurological illness for the rest of his life. During the era of Rabindranath Tagore, he disregarded Tagore's influence and created a distinct and independent stream in Bengali literature.

=== Nargis Asar Khanam ===
Nargis Asar Khanam, birth name Syeda Khatun, is born in 1904 She was the niece of Ali Akbar Khan of Comilla. In 1921, Kazi Nazrul Islam came to stay at Ali Akbar Khan’s house. During this time, Nazrul fell in love with Nargis, who was living in the same household. When Nazrul proposed marriage to Nargis, Akbar accepted. However, although the marriage was formally completed, Nazrul left Akbar's house on the wedding night. The couple were later divorced. Afterward, Nargis studied at Kamrunnessa Government Girls High School and became a novelist. In 1937, Nargis and Nazrul met for the last time. On that occasion, Nazrul assured her that he would discuss and resolve her problem related to their marital issues after returning to Dhaka, although he expressed his inability to accept her due to his wife and children. However, he ultimately failed to keep his promise. Nargis later married the poet Azizul Hakim and died in the United States in 1985.

=== Pramila Kazi ===
Pramila Kazi was born as Ashalata Sengupta. She was born in 1908 in Manikganj subdivision of Dacca district in the Bengal Presidency, British India, at the residence of Nayeb Basanta Kumar Sengupta of Tripura state. After the untimely death of Pramila’s father, her mother moved with her to Comilla in the 1920s, where her uncle Indra Kumar Sengupta was employed as an inspector of the Court of Wards. From 1921 onwards, Kazi Nazrul Islam visited Indra's house several times. During this period, Nazrul and Pramila fell in love with each other. In 1924, the two were married in Kolkata according to Muslim rites, although she remained Hindu. After being paralysed in 1938, Pramila died in 1962.

=== Kazi Sabyasachi ===
Kazi Sabyasachi Islam, son of Kazi Nazrul Islam and Pramila Kazi, was born in Kolkata in 1929. He joined All India Radio as a programme announcer. He was a pioneer of commercial recitation as a profession in India. He later became the chief officer of the programme announcer training centre of All India Radio. During the Bangladesh Liberation War in 1971, he worked as a poetry reciter and news reader for the Swadhin Bangla Betar Kendra. He died in Kolkata in 1979.

=== Kazi Aniruddha ===
Kazi Aniruddha, the youngest son of Kazi Nazrul Islam, was born in 1931. He was a musician and guitarist. Alongside his employment at All India Radio, he had been associated with several music schools since the 1950s. He played an important role in preserving and recovering his father Nazrul's creative works. He also prepared musical notations for Nazrul Geeti. He died of a heart attack in Kolkata in 1974.

=== Others ===
- Zahida Khatun – Second wife of Kazi Fakir Ahmad. After her husband’s death, she married Fakir’s cousin. She died in 1928.
- Kazi Sahib Jaan – Eldest son of Kazi Fakir Ahmad. He initially worked as a deed writer and later took a job at a coal mine in Raniganj.
- Kazi Ali Hossain – Youngest son of Kazi Fakir Ahmad. He was a deed writer and social worker. He was murdered in 1951.
- Uma Kazi – Born in 1940. She worked as a nurse in Kolkata and later married Kazi Sabyasachi. She devoted her life to caring for her ailing father-in-law, Nazrul. She died in Dhaka in 2020.
- Bidyut Kazi – Grandson of Kazi Ali Hossain. He died in Durgapur in 2021.
- Lipi Kazi – Granddaughter of Kazi Ali Hossain. She died in 2023.
- Kalyani Kazi – Born in 1936. She was a vocalist and the wife of Kazi Aniruddha. She was honored with the Sangeet Mahasamman by the Government of West Bengal. She died in Kolkata in 2023.
- Anirban Kazi – Born in 1975. Son of Kazi Aniruddha. He died of a heart attack in Kolkata in 2024.
- Babul Kazi – Son of Kazi Sabyasachi. Born in India in 1966. He studied at Dhaka Residential Model College and the University of Dhaka. He was a garment businessman by profession. He died in Dhaka in 2025 after being burned in a fire.
- Khilkhil Kazi – Born in 1962. Daughter of Kazi Sabyasachi. After her father’s death, she migrated to Dhaka in 1985. She is a professional vocalist.
- Anindita Kazi – Resides in Kolkata. Daughter of Aniruddha Kazi. She is a vocalist and studied music at the University of Allahabad. She is a former president of Tara TV.

== Genealogy ==
Kazi Khebratullah
Kazi Golam Hossain | Kazi Abdul Jalil | Kazi Joynal Abedin | Kazi Kamruddin
Kazi Aminullah | Kazi Najibullah
Kazi Bazle Karim | Jaheda Khatun
Sayyada Khatun | Kazi Fakir Ahmed | Jaheda Khatun
Sajdonnessa | Kazi Sahebjan | Deceased | Deceased | Deceased | Kazi Nazrul Islam | Umme Kulsum | Kazi Ali Hossain
Promila Kazi | Nargis Khanam | Kazi Mazahar Hossain | Kazi Rezaul Karim
Kazi Azad Kamal | Kazi Arindam Khaled | Kazi Sabyasachi Islam | Kazi Aniruddha Islam
Bidyut Kazi | Lipi Kazi
Uma Kazi | Kalyani Kazi
Khilkhil Kazi | Misti Kazi | Babul Kazi | Anirban Kazi | Arindam Kazi | Anindita Kazi
Mosfek Khan | Arun Agarwal | Runa Kazi | Soma Mukherjee | Suparna Bhowmick | Amit Roy
Arian Khan | Ariat Khan | Sneha Agarwal | Amena Agarwal | Ahnaf Kazi | Sajwad Kazi | Daughter | Angkan Kazi | Aishwarya Kazi | Abhipsa Kazi | Anurag Kazi | Anwesha Roy | Son
