= Kazi Abu Zafar Siddique =

Bangladeshi journalist

- কাজী আবু জাফর সিদ্দিকী
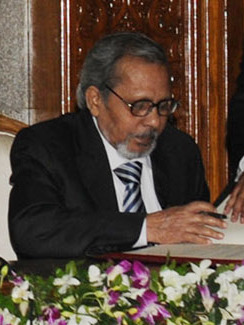
- Zafar in 2011
- Born: 1940; Bardhaman district, Bengal Province, British India
- Died: 15 October 2012 (aged 71–72); Dhaka, Bangladesh

Kazi Abu Zafar Mohammed Hasan Siddiqui (1940 – 15 October 2012) was a recital artist and cultural activist of Bangladesh. He was the director general of Bangladesh Television. According to Kazi Nazrul Islam's eldest son, the first winner of the Kazi Sabyasachi Award was the personification of Cultural Personality, launched by the Ministry of Culture of the Government of Bangladesh.

== Career ==
Zafar Siddiqui was born in 1940 in Bardhaman district of West Bengal. He started his first career as an assistant director at East Pakistan Television Corporation in 1970. He was associated with the profession of recitation and culture for more than 40 years. He was the founding president of Bangabandhu Recruitment Council and vocabulary organization and a member of the advisory board of the Bangladesh Recruitment Coordination Council. He was also involved with several cultural organizations. He also served as Director of Programs and Planning at Bangladesh Television, of which he became the director general in 2009. He retired in February 2012.

=== Award ===
Siddique received the Kazi Sabyasachi Award by the Ministry of Cultural Affairs in Bangladesh for his contribution to recitation. Lifetime honors (2006-2007 ) were conferred on the media department at the eighth event of the Bachsas Award given by the Bangladesh Cine-Journalist Association.

== Death ==
Siddiqui died on 15 October 2012 in Dhaka. He was buried in the Jurain Cemetery.
