= Qazi Afsaruddin Ahmed =

Bangladeshi journalist

Qazi Afsaruddin Ahmed was a Bengali journalist and writer.

== Early life ==
Ahmed was born on 24 September 1921 in Chatmohar, Pabna District, East Bengal, British India. His ancestral home is in Manikganj district. He studied in Chittagong Collegiate School.

== Career ==
Ahmed started working as a journalist in Culcatta (now Kolkata). From 1941 to 1946, he served as the editor of the magazine Mrittika. He worked at Shaogat and Dexer Katha. From in 1945 to 1947, he served as the acting editor of The Mohammadi. He moved to Dhaka following the Partition of India. He worked as the editor of the daily Zindegi in 1947. He also worked as the editor of Insaf newspaper. He started working as the senior sub-editor of Pak-Samachar and Nabarun of the Information Department of the Pakistan government in 1951. He worked there till 1972. In 1966, he was awarded the Bangla Academy Award for literature for Char Bhanga Char, his novel published 1951. He did not support the independence of Bangladesh.

== Death ==
Ahmed died on 26 March 1975 in Dhaka, Bangladesh.
