= Churulia =

- Suburb of Asansol
- Location in West Bengal, India Churulia (India)
- Coordinates: 23.78°N 87.08°E
- Country: India
- State: West Bengal
- District: Paschim Bardhaman
- Elevation: 94 m (308 ft)
- Demonym: Asansolians / Asansolites/ Asansolbashi

Languages*
  - Official: Bengali, English
- Time zone: UTC+5:30 (IST)
- Telephone code: 91 341
- Lok Sabha constituency: Asansol
- Vidhan Sabha constituency: Jamuria
- Website: paschimbardhaman.co.in

Churulia is a suburb of Asansol under the Jamuria CD block, in the Asansol Sadar subdivision of the Paschim Bardhaman district in the state of West Bengal, India.

== History ==
It is the birthplace of Bengali poet Kazi Nazrul Islam, and the resting place of his wife Pramila Devi. Many of the manuscripts, medallions and other belongings of the poet are preserved at Nazrul Academy in the village. Nearby, there is a college bearing the poet's name. Nazrul Academy was established in 1958.

It is believed that there was a fort at Churulia in olden days. It fell to Sher Khan, the Afghan chieftain in the 16th century. A mound in the village is believed to contain the ruins of the fort.

During the Muslim rule a mosque was built at Churulia. It is a good example of Islamic architecture.

== Geography ==
Cities and towns in the eastern portion of Asansol Sadar subdivision in Paschim Bardhaman district
MC: Municipal Corporation, CT: census town, N: neighbourhood, R: rural centre
Owing to space constraints in the small map, the actual locations in a larger map may vary slightly

=== Location ===
Churulia is located at 23.78°N 87.08°E. It has an average elevation of 94 metres (311 feet).

Churulia is located on the south bank of Ajay River.

=== Urbanisation ===
According to the 2011 census, 83.33% of the population of Asansol Sadar subdivision was urban and 16.67% was rural. In 2015, the municipal areas of Kulti, Raniganj and Jamuria were included within the jurisdiction of Asansol Municipal Corporation. Asansol Sadar subdivision has 26 (+1 partly) Census Towns.(partly presented in the map alongside; all places marked on the map are linked in the full-screen map).

== Demographics ==
According to the 2011 Census of India Churulia had a total population of 8,173 of which 4,203 (51%) were males and 3,970 (49%) were females. Population below in the age range 0–6 years was 1,286. The total number of literate persons in Churulia was 4,470 (64.70% of the population over 6 years).

*For language details see Jamuria (community development block)#Language and religion

== Economy ==
Churulia is situated in the heart of Raniganj Coalfield, one of India's coal mining areas.

== Transport ==
There are two minibus routes serving Churulia – one from Churulia to Asansol via Kalla and Domahani, and other from Churulia (Ajay Ghat) to Chittaranjan via Asansol and Chandrachur.

== Education ==
Kazi Nazrul Islam Mahavidyalaya was established in 1981 at Churulia. It is affiliated with Kazi Nazrul University. It offers honours courses in Bengali, Hindi, English, history, geography, political science and B.Com.

== Healthcare ==
There is a primary health centre at Churulia, with 6 beds.

== Notable people ==
- Kazi Nazrul Islam, poet

== See also ==
- Kazi family of Churulia
