= Khilkhil Kazi =

Bangladeshi singer

- খিলখিল কাজী
- Occupation: Singer
- Spouse: Mosfek Khan
- Children: Arian Khan, Ariat Khan
- Parents: Kazi Sabyasachi (father); Uma Kazi (mother)
- Relatives: Kazi Nazrul Islam (grandfather); Mistee Kazi (sister); Babul Kazi (brother)
- Family: Kazi family of Churulia

Khilkhil Kazi is a Bangladeshi singer. She is the daughter of elocutionist Kazi Sabyasachi and Uma Kazi, and granddaughter of Kazi Nazrul Islam, the national poet of Bangladesh. She was awarded Nazrul Award 2013 by the Nazrul Institute.
