= List of things named after Ziaur Rahman =

This is a list of things named after Ziaur Rahman, the 7th President of Bangladesh (1977–1981). This list includes proposed name changes.

== Buildings ==
- Zia Memorial Museum in Chittagong
- Muktijoddha Ziaur Rahman Hall in University of Dhaka
- Shaheed Ziaur Rahman Hall in University of Rajshahi
- Shahid Ziaur Rahman Hall in Islamic University, Bangladesh
- Shahid President Ziaur Rahman Hall in Rajshahi University of Engineering and Technology

== Educational institutions ==
- Shaheed Ziaur Rahman Medical College in Bogra
- Shahid Ziaur Rahman College in Dinajpur District
- Shahid Ziaur Rahaman Degree College in Barisal District
- Shahid President Ziaur Rahman College in Dhaka District
- K. C. Shaheed Ziaur Rahman Degree College in Chittagong District
- Shahid Ziaur Rahman Degree College in Jamalpur District

== Streets ==
- Ziaur Rahman Way in Chicago
- Bir Uttom Ziaur Rahman Road in Dhaka
- Ziaur Rahman Street in Ankara

== Topographical features ==
- Zia Udyan in Dhaka
- Zia Park in Chittagong District
- Shahid Zia Shishu Park in Dhaka
- Shahid Zia Shishu Park in Rajshahi

== See also ==
- List of things named after Sheikh Mujibur Rahman
- List of things named after Sheikh Hasina
