= List of things named after Sheikh Mujibur Rahman =

This is a list of entities named after Bangabandhu Sheikh Mujibur Rahman, the founding leader of Bangladesh, who served as the country's first and fourth president and as its second prime minister.

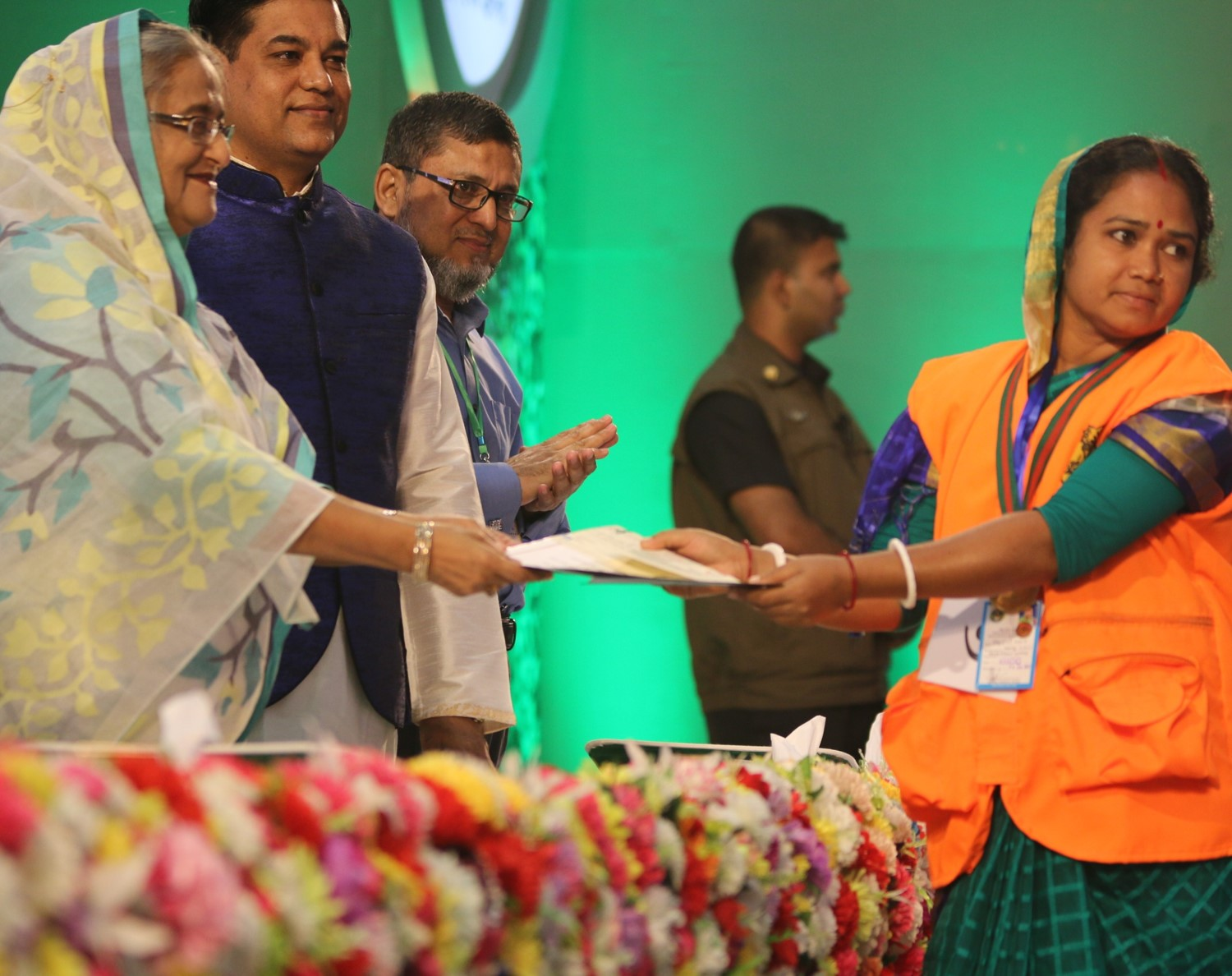
Prime Minister Sheikh Hasina presenting the "Bangabandhu Award for Wildlife Conservation 2017" to VTRT WildTeam.

The list also includes name changes and former names which follows the end of his daughter Sheikh Hasina's 16 year rule and the subsequent renaming of most such entities by the new government.

== Awards ==
Award	Status
UNESCO-Bangladesh Bangabandhu Sheikh Mujibur Rahman International Prize for the Creative Economy	
Bangabandhu International Award	Proposed
Bangabandhu Sheikh Mujibur Rahman Peace Award Policy 2024	Cancelled
Bangabandhu Award for Wildlife Conservation'	
Commonwealth-Bangladesh Bangabandhu Sheikh Mujibur Rahman Green Business Award	
Bangabandhu Sheikh Mujib Industrial Award	
Bangabandhu award for Diplomatic Excellence	
Bangabandhu International Cyber Security Awareness Award	
Bangabandhu Sheikh Mujibur Rahman Research Award of the Chowdhury Center for Bangladesh Studies at University of California, Berkeley.	
Bangabandhu-Edward Heath Friendship Award	
Bangabandhu National Agriculture Award-1423	

== Chairs ==
Title	Institution
Bangabandhu Chair	Asian Institute of Technology.
Bangabandhu Chair	University of Saskatchewan.
Bangabandhu Chair	Delhi University.
Bangabandhu Chair	Bangladesh University of Professionals.
Bangabandhu Chair	Khulna University of Engineering & Technology.
Bangabandhu Chair	National University, Bangladesh.
Bangabandhu Chair	University of Brasília
Bangabandhu Chair	University of Rajshahi.
Bangabandhu Chair	University of Chittagong.
Bangladesh Chair	Bangabandhu Sheikh Mujibur Rahman Professorial Fellowship at the South Asia Institute of Heidelberg University.
Bangladesh Chair	Bangabandhu Sheikh Mujibur Rahman Professional Fellowship, Department of Statistics, University of Dhaka.
Bangabandhu Research Chair	Gazipur Agricultural University.

== Educational institutions ==
Universities
Institution	Location	Renamed to
Bangabandhu Sheikh Mujib Medical University	Dhaka, Bangladesh	Bangladesh Medical University
Bangabandhu Sheikh Mujib Medical College	Faridpur, Bangladesh	Faridpur Medical College
Bangabandhu Medical College	Sunamganj, Bangladesh	Sunamganj Medical College
Bangabandhu Sheikh Mujibur Rahman Agricultural University	Gazipur District, Bangladesh	Gazipur Agricultural University
Bangabandhu Sheikh Mujibur Rahman Science and Technology University	Gopalganj, Bangladesh	Gopalganj Science and Technology University
Bangabandhu Sheikh Mujibur Rahman Digital University	Gazipur, Bangladesh	University of Frontier Technology, Bangladesh
Bangabandhu Sheikh Mujibur Rahman Aviation and Aerospace University	Lalmonirhat, Bangladesh	Aviation and Aerospace University, Bangladesh
Bangabandhu Sheikh Mujibur Rahman University	Kishoreganj, Bangladesh	Kishoreganj University
Bangabandhu Sheikh Mujibur Rahman Maritime University	Chattogram, Bangladesh	Bangladesh Maritime University
Bangabandhu Sheikh Mujibur Rahman Science and Technology University	Pirojpur, Bangladesh	Pirojpur Science and Technology University
Bangabandhu Sheikh Mujibur Rahman University	Naogaon, Bangladesh	Naogaon University
Bangabandhu Sheikh Mujibur Rahman Shariatpur Agricultural University	Shariatpur, Bangladesh	Shariatpur Agriculture University

Colleges
Institution	Location	Renamed to
Bangabandhu Textile Engineering College	Tangail District, Bangladesh	Tangail Textile Engineering College
Government Bangabandhu College	Gopalganj, Bangladesh	Gopalganj Government College
Bangabandhu Institute of Liberation War and Bangladesh Studies	Gopalganj, Bangladesh	
Bangabandhu Women College	Mongla Port, Bagerhat District, Bangladesh	Mongla Government Mohila College
Jatir Janak Bangabandhu Sheikh Mujib Memorial College	Kaliganj District, Bangladesh	Bhatibazar Government Degree College
Bangabandhu College in Sreepur	Magura District, Bangladesh	Sreepir Government College
Bangabandhu College	Melandaha, Bangladesh	Ghoserpara Government College
Shimulbari Bangabandhu Degree College	Joldhakar, Bangladesh	Shimulbari Degree College
Fulbari Chintamoni Bangabandhu College	Fulbari, Dinajpur District, Bangladesh	Fulbari Government College
Jatir Janak Bangabandhu College	Pangsha, Rajbari District, Bangladesh	Pangsha Government College
Kharshuti Bangabandhu College	Boalmari, Faridpur District, Bangladesh	Kharshuti Government College
Bangabandhu Textile Engineering College	Tangail, Bangladesh	Tangail Textile Engineering College

Schools
Institution	Location	Renamed to
Jatir Janak Bangabandhu Sheikh Mujibur Rahman Govt. College	Dhaka, Bangladesh	Uttara Government College, Dhaka
Bangabandhu College	Gopalganj District, Bangladesh	Gopalganj Government College
Jatir Pita Bangabandhu College	Gazipur District, Bangladesh	Kaliakoir Government College
Bangabandhu Degree College	Rajshahi District, Bangladesh	Padma Government College
Shimulbari Bangabandhu Degree College	Nilphamari District	Shimulbari Government College
Govt. Mujib College	Companiganj, Noakhali, Bangladesh	Companiganj Government College
Bangabandhu Govt. College	Badalgachi, Naogaon, Bangladesh	Badalgachhi Government College
Syedpur Bangabandhu High School	Narayanganj District, Bangladesh	
Bangabandhu Primary School	London, United Kingdom	
Ambary Bangabandhu School	Nilphamari District, Bangladesh	
Bangabandhu Government Primary School	Sutrapur, Bangladesh	Karkunbari government primary school.
Bangabandhu Covernment Primary School	Mohammadpur, Bangladesh	Tajmahal Government Primary School.
16 no Bangabandhu Govt Primary School		16no Paikpara Paschim Govt Primary School.
Bangabandhu Sheikh Mujibur Rahman Agricultural University Govt Primary School	Gazipur, Bangladesh	Gazipur Agricultural University Govt Primary School.
Pirojpur Bangabandhu Govt Primary School		Pashim Pirojpur Govt Primary School.
Bangabandhu Govt Primary School	Muktagacha, Bangladesh	Bhaluk Chapar Govt Primary School.
Bangabandhu Govt Primary School	Dhaganbhuiyan, Feni, Bangladesh	Kalmullyapur Govt Primary School.
Nitarkandi Bangabandhu Govt Primary School	Bajitpur, Bangladesh	Nitarkandi Govt Primary School.
Bangabandhu Govt Primary School	Kishorganj Sadar, Bangladesh	Battris Govt Primary School.
Jatir Janak Bangabandhu Govt Primary School	Gopalpur, Bangladesh	Dakshin Sonamui Govt Primary School.
Bangabandhu Bridge East Rehabilitation Government Primary School		Jamuna Bridge Rehabilitation Government Primary School.
Bangabandhu Government Primary School	Khulna Sadar, Bangladesh	Khalishpur Bangabasi Government Primary School.

Student hostels
Institution	University	Renamed to
Jatir Janak Bangabandhu Sheikh Mujibur Rahman Hall	University of Dhaka	Jatiya Kabi Kazi Nazrul Islam Hall
Bangabandhu Tower	University of Dhaka	
Bangabandhu Sheikh Mujibur Rahman Hall	University of Rajshahi	
Bangabandhu Sheikh Mujibur Rahman Hall	Begum Rokeya University	
Jatir Janak Bangabandhu Sheikh Mujibur Rahman Hall	Kazi Nazrul University	
Jatir Janak Bangabandhu Sheikh Mujibur Rahman Hall	Khulna University	Bir Shreshtha Mohammad Ruhul Amin Hall.
Bangabandhu Shekh Mujibur Rahman Hall	Comilla University	
Bangabandhu Hall	Chittagong University of Engineering and Technology	
Bangabandhu Sheikh Mujibur Rahman Hall	Mawlana Bhashani Science and Technology University	
Bangabandhu Hall	Islamic University, Bangladesh	Shah Azizur Rahman Hall

Scholarships
Scholarship	Status	Presented by
Bangabandhu Marine Scholarship	Proposed	International Maritime Organization
Bangabandhu PhD Scholarship		University of Dhaka
Bangabandhu Sheikh Mujibur Rahman Student Scholarship		
ASA-Bangabandhu Higher Education Scholarship-2020		Association for Social Advancement
Bangabandhu Higher Education Scholarship Programme		Bangabandhu Science and Technology Fellowship Trust
Science and Technology Fellowship Trust.		Government of Bangladesh
UGC Bangabandhu Sheikh Mujib Fellowship		University Grants Commission of Bangladesh
Bangabandhu Merit Award Scholarship		University of Dhaka
Bangabandhu Peace Philosophy and World Peace Scholarship		
Bangabandhu Overseas Scholarship		University of Dhaka

== Military ==
Title	Notes	Renamed to
Mujib Battery	First artillery unit of Bangladesh Army formed during the Bangladesh Liberation War.	
Bangabandhu Naubahar	First naval fleet of Bangladesh Navy formed during the Bangladesh Liberation War.	
Bangabandhu Military Museum	Ad-hoc museum.	Bangladesh Military Museum
Bangabandhu Composite Military Farm		Composite Military Farm, Jazira
Bangabandhu Museum	Situated in Dhaka Cantonment	Independence Museum.
Bangabandhu Cantonment Public School and College	Situated in Tangail, Bangladesh	Jamuna Cantonment Public School and College.
Bangabandhu Sheikh Mujib Battery Complex		Artillery Center and School.
Mujib Battery Road	Situated in Halishahar, Chattogram	Golandaz Road
BNS Sheikh Mujib		BNS Dhaka
Bangabandhu Aeronautical Centre		Bangladesh Aeronautical Centre
BAF Bangabandhu Complex		BAFA Complex
Bangabandhu Memorial Museum	Situated in Ganabhaban Complex of the Ministry of Defence	Defence Museum
Bangabandhu Cantonment		Jamuna Cantonment
Bangabandhu Complex	Part of the Bangladesh Military Academy	BMA Academic Complex
Mujib Regiment Artillery		1st Field Regiment Artillery.
BNS Bangabandhu		BNS Khalid Bin Walid
BAF Base Bangabandhu		BAF Base Bir Uttom A. K. Khandker
Bangabandhu Basic Trainer		

== Streets, bridges and tunnel ==
Infrastructure	Location	Renamed to
Sheikh Mujib Road	Chittagong, Bangladesh	
Bangabandhu Road	Narayanganj, Bangladesh	
Mujib Sharak	Faridpur, Bangladesh	
Bangabandhu Avenue	Gulistan, Dhaka, Bangladesh	Shaheed Abrar Fahad Avenue
Father of the Nation Bangabandhu Sheikh Mujibur Rahman Expressway	Jatrabari, Dhaka, Bangladesh	Dhaka–Bhanga Expressway.
Father of the Nation Bangabandhu Sheikh Mujibur Rahman Highway		Airport Bypass Intersection-Lalbagh-Salutikar-Companiganj-Bholaganj National Highway
Bangabandhu Sheikh Mujib Sarani	Kolkata, India	
Bangabandhu Sheikh Mujib Road	New Delhi, India	
Bangabandhu Sheikh Mudjibur Rahman Boulevard (Turkish: Bangabandhu Şeyh Muciburrahman Bulvarı)	Ankara, Turkey (Note: The road renamed as "Bangabandhu Boulevard" after complaints about its difficulty of pronunciation.)	Bangabandhu Boulevard (Turkish: Bangabandhu Bulvarı)
Bangabandhu Boulevard (Turkish: Bangabandhu Bulvarı)	Ankara, Turkey	
Bangabandhu Sheikh Mujib Street in Port Louis, Mauritius		
Sheikh Mujib Way	Chicago, United States	
Bangabandhu Sheikh Mujibur Rahman Street	Hebron, Palestine	
Bangabandhu Sheikh Mujibur Rahman Tunnel	Karnaphuli river, Chattogram, Bangladesh	Karnaphuli Tunnel
Bangabandhu Railway Bridge		Jamuna Railway Bridge

== Sports tournaments ==
Title	Sport
Bangabandhu T20 Cup 2020	Cricket
Bangabandhu Cup	Football
Banglabandhu Cup	Kabaddi
Bangabandhu Bangladesh Games	Judo
Bangabandu Federation Cup Men's Handball Tournament	Handball
Bangabandhu National Women's Handball Championship	Handball
Bangabandhu Bangladesh Premier League	Cricket
Bangabandhu Sheikh Mujibur Rahman National Gold Cup	Football
Bangabandhu Primary School Gold Cup	Football
Bangabandhu Inter University Gold Cup	Football
Sheikh Mujibur Rahman Inter College Football Tournament	Football
Bangabandhu Squash Tournament	Squash
Bangabandhu Open Golf	Golf
Mujib Borsho Golf Cup	Golf
Bangabandhu Diplomatic Cup	Tennis
Bangabandhu International Squash Tournament	Squash
Bangabandhu 5th Central South Asian Artistic Gymnastics	Gymnastics
Bangabandhu National Fencing Tournament	Fencing
Bangabandhu Inter University Sports Championship's	Badminton
Bangabandhu-Bangladesh International Junior Challenge	Badminton
Bangabandhu National School Hockey	Hockey
Bangabandhu President Cup Championship	Fencing
Bangabandhu FIDE Rapid Women's Chess Tournament	Chess
Bangabandhu 4-Nation Physically Challenged Cricket Tournament	Cricket
Bangabandhu South Asian Football Federation Championship	Football
Bangabandhu Independence Day U16 3on3 Basketball Tournament	Basketball
Bangabandhu Victory Day Volleyball	Volleyball

== Organizations ==
- Mujibnagar Government, provincial government of Bangladesh during the Bangladesh Liberation War.
- Bangabandhu Memorial Trust
- Bangabandhu Council Australia
- Bangabandhu Parishad
- Bangabandhu Awami Ainjibi Parishad
- Bangabandhu Matsyajibi Parishad
- Bangabandhu Sangskritik Jote
- Bangabandhu Sainik League
- International Bangabandhu Foundation
- Bangladesh Bondhu Foundation
- Bangabandhu Institute of Comparative Literature and Culture, Jahangirnagar University.

== Structures ==
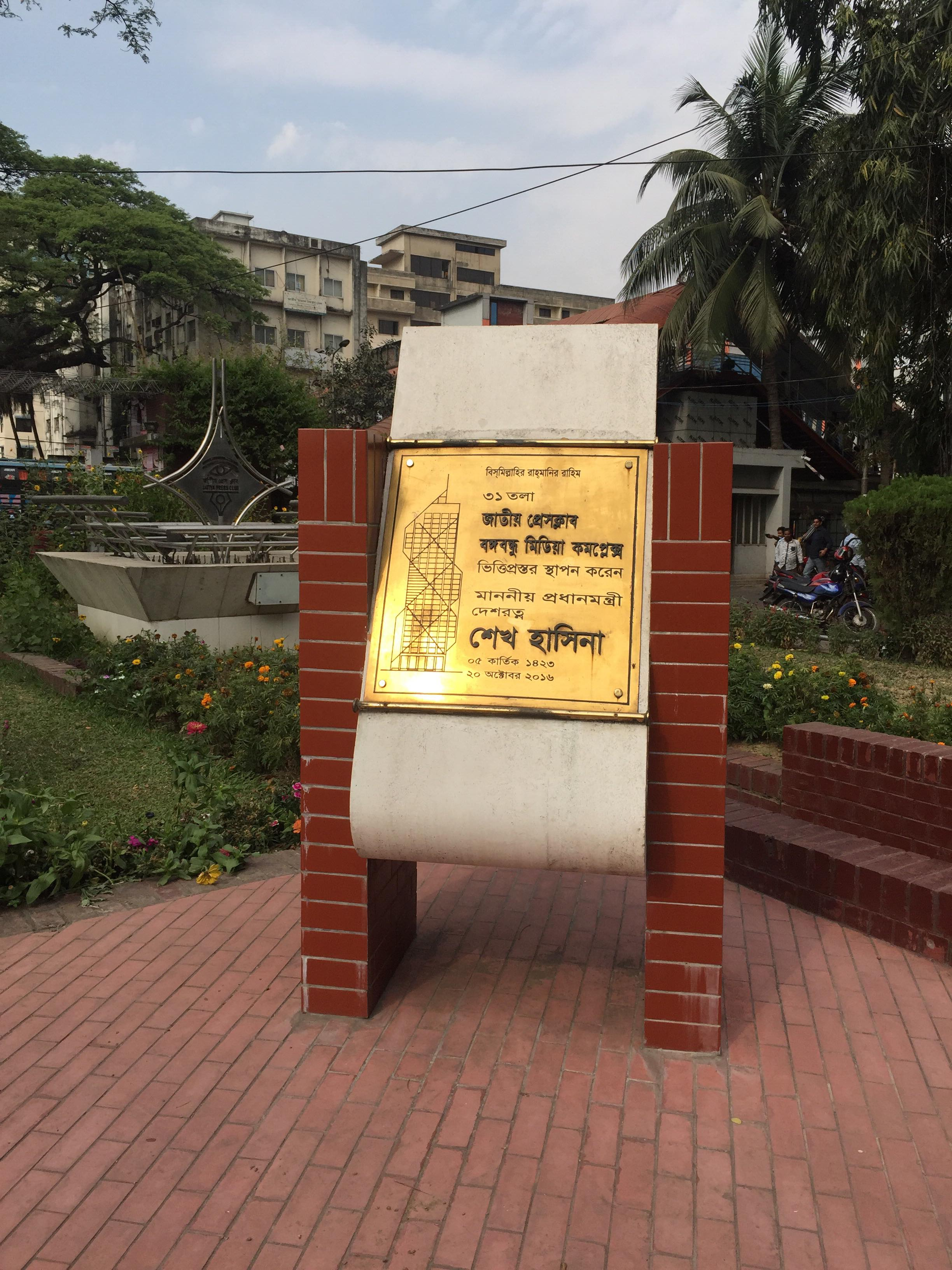
Inauguration plaque of the "Bangabandhu Media Complex" at the Jatiya Press Club.

Title	Notes	Status/Renamed to
Bangabandhu Memorial Museum	Personal residence of Tungipara Sheikh family	Demolished
Bangabandhu National Stadium		National Stadium
Bangabandhu Memorial Hospital	Situated in Chittagong	
Bangabandhu Square		Rajshahi Development Authority Complex
Bangabandhu Sheikh Mujibur Rahman Novo Theatre		Novo Theatre, Dhaka
Bangabandhu International Conference Center		Bangladesh China Friendship Conference Center
Bangabandhu Sheikh Mujibur Rahman Space Observatory Centre		
Bangabandhu Sheikh Mujib International Airport Project	Located in Faridpur District, Bangladesh.	Scrapped
Bangabandhu Tri-Tower		Proposed
Situated in Rajshahi	Novo Theatre, Rajshahi	
Bangabandhu Boat Museum	First boat museum of Bangladesh.	Destroyed
Bangabandhu Bridge East Police Station		Jamuna Bridge East Police Station
Bangabandhu Bridge West Police Station		Jamuna Bridge West Police Station
Bangabandhu (Daldalia) Union Health Sub Center		Daldalia Union Health Sub Center
Mujibnagar Police Station		
Mujibnagar Memorial Complex		

== Places ==
- Bangabandhu Island
- Bangabandhu Sheikh Mujib Shilpa Nagar, renamed to National Special Economic Zone.
- Bangabandhu Beach
- Bangabandhu Hi-Tech City, renamed to Kaliakoir Hi–Tech Park.
- Bangabandhu Hi-Tech City Station in Kaliakair, renamed to Kaliakoir Hi–Tech City railway station.
- Bangabandhu Sheikh Mujib Hi-tech Park, Rajshahi, renamed to Hi-Tech Park, Rajshahi.
- Bangabandhu Sheikh Mujib Safari Park, renamed to Gazipur Safari Park.
- Bangabandhu Sheikh Mujib Safari Park in Cox's Bazar District, renamed to Dulhazra Safari Park.
- The proposed Bangabandhu Sheikh Mujib Safari Park project in Moulvibazar District was cancelled.
- Char Baspur Shat Barshi Mujib Park
- Bangabandhu Media Centre at the Press Club of India.
- Bangabandhu park in Ankara, Turkey.
- Mujibnagar Upazila

== Others ==
Title	Notes	Renamed to
Bangabandhu Satellite-1	Bangladesh's first geostationary communications and broadcasting satellite	Bangladesh Satellite-1
Bangabandhu satellite-2	Proposed	
Bangabandhu Dhan100	A variety of rice.	
Bangabandhu Mobile Railway Museum		
Glycera sheikhmujibi	Species of polychaete worm.	
Bangabandhu Suraksha Bima for Persons of Disabilities	Health Insurance for the disabled.	

== See also ==
- Sheikh–Wazed family
- List of artistic depictions of Sheikh Mujibur Rahman
- Sheikh Mujibur Rahman's cult of personality
- List of things named after Sheikh Hasina
- List of things named after Kazi Nazrul Islam
