= Hans Hoff =

Hans Hoff may refer to:

- Hans Hoff (politician)
- Hans Hoff (psychiatrist)
