= Bijli (Weekly Newspaper) =

Weekly Bengali newspaper

- Type: Weekly Bengali newspaper
- Format: Broadsheet
- Publisher: Nalinikanta Sarkar; Barindra Kumar Ghosh; Sachchidananda Sengupta; Arun Singh and; Dinesh Ranjan
- Editor: Nalinikanta Sarkar; Prabodh Kumar Sanyal
- Founded: 1920
- Language: Bengali
- Country: British India

Bijli is the name of a weekly Bengali newspaper first published in 1920. It was a film magazine started by Nalinikanta Sarkar, Barindra Kumar Ghosh, Sachchidananda Sengupta, Arun Singh and Dinesh Ranjan Das. Notable among its editors were Nalinikanta Sarkar, Prabodh Kumar Sanyal and others.

== Significant revelations ==
'The Rebel '(Bidrohi) the famous poem of the National poet of Bangladesh Kazi Nazrul Islam was first published in this magazine on Friday, 7 January 1922 (22 Poush 1326 BS) . At that time the editor of the paper was Nalinikanta Sarkar. Bijli had to be printed twice that day, numbering 29,000. According to Muzaffar Ahmed, at least 200,000 people rebelled that day.
