= List of things named after Sheikh Hasina =

This is a list of things named after Sheikh Hasina, former Prime Minister of Bangladesh and longest serving prime minister in the history of Bangladesh. This list includes proposed name changes.

== Buildings ==
- Sheikh Hasina Cultural Village, Jamalpur

=== Bridges ===
- Gangachara Sheikh Hasina Bridge, a bridge over Teesta River
- Sheikh Hasina Bridge, a bridge over Mahananda River.
- Sheikh Hasina Bridge, a bridge over Madhumati River.
- Sheikh Hasina Bridge, a bridge over Meghna River.
- Sheikh Hasina Bridge, a bridge over Dhaleshwari River.

== Educational institutions ==
=== Colleges ===
- Sheikh Hasina Govt. Girls' High School and College, Gopalganj
- Sheikh Hasina Padma Pukur Degree College, Jhenaidah
- Sheikh Hasina Academy & Women's College, Madaripur
- Sheikh Hasina Academy, Pirojpur

== Streets ==
- Sheikh Hasina Road, Chittagong.

== Flora ==
- Dendrobium Sheikh Hasina, a types of Orchid in Singapore Botanic Gardens

== See also ==
- Sheikh–Wazed family
- List of things named after Sheikh Mujibur Rahman
- List of things named after Kazi Nazrul Islam
