= List of things named after Kazi Nazrul Islam =

This is a list of things named after Kazi Nazrul Islam, the national poet of Bangladesh, popularly known as Nazrul.

- Nazrul Geeti refers to the songs written and composed by Nazrul.
- Nazrul Jayanti is Nazrul's birthday celebrated by various schools, colleges & universities of Bengal, and also by Bengalis around the world.

== Organizations ==
- Nazrul Institute
- Bangladesh Nazrul Sena
- Nazrul Endowment
- Jatiya Nazrul Samaj
- Nazrul Academy, Maghbazar, Dhaka

== Educational institutions ==
- Jatiya Kabi Kazi Nazrul Islam University
- Kazi Nazrul University
- Kabi Nazrul Government College
- Kabi Nazrul College
- Kazi Nazrul Islam Mahavidyalaya
- Nazrul Sena School
- Nazrul Centenary Polytechnic
- Nazrul Research Centre, University of Dhaka
- Kabi Nazrul Govt. Primary School, Narayanganj, Bangladesh
- Nagarghata Kabi Nazrul Biddapith, Satkhira
- Trishal Govt. Nazrul Academy former Darirampur High School.
- National Poet Kazi Nazrul Islam Central Library, University of Khulna

== Buildings ==
- Nazrul Mancha
- Nazrul Tirtha
- Nazrul Mancha, Kamarhati
- Nazrul Islam Hall, Bangladesh University of Engineering and Technology
- Kazi Nazrul Islam Hall, Comilla University
- Kobi Kazi Nazrul Islam Hall, Sher-e-Bangla Agricultural University
- Nazrul Islam Hall (Bangladesh University of Textiles)
- Kazi Nazrul Islam Auditorium (University of Rajshahi)
- Kobi Nazrul Auditorium; Rikabibazar, Sylhet

== Streets ==
- Kazi Nazrul Islam Sarani, Kolkata, West Bengal, India
- Kazi Nazrul Islam Avenue, Dhaka, Bangladesh
- Kabi Nazrul School Road, Bandar, Narayanganj, Bangladesh

== Station and Airport ==
- Kazi Nazrul Islam Airport
- Kavi Nazrul metro station
