= Bangabandhu Sheikh Mujib Road =

Road in New Delhi, India

Coordinates: 28.6255603°N 77.197457°E

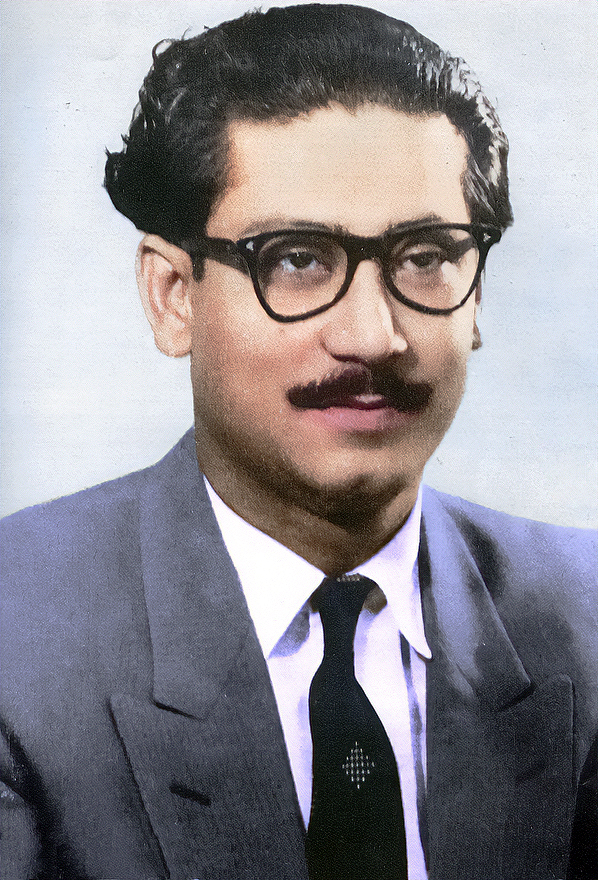
Sheikh Mujibur Rahman after whom the road is named

Bangabandhu Sheikh Mujib Road (Bengali: বঙ্গবন্ধু শেখ মুজিব সড়ক, Hindi: बंगबंधु शेख मुजीब मार्ग, Urdu: بنگ بندھو شیخ مجیب مارگ) is a street situated in Lutyens' Delhi at the centre of New Delhi, capital of India. The road was formerly named Park Street. The name was changed by New Delhi Municipal Council as a "friendly gesture" towards Bangladesh. The road is named after Bangabandhu Sheikh Mujibur Rahman, founding president of Bangladesh. The newly renamed road was opened by Prime Minister Sheikh Hasina and Prime Minister Narendra Modi on 8 April 2017.

The road starts from traffic roundabout that connects Shankar Road and Mandir Marg, from that point the road goes towards Mother Teresa Crescent. Dr. Ram Manohar Lohia Hospital is located next to it. The road is located 2.25 km from Rashtrapati Bhavan.

Sushma Swaraj, then External Affairs Minister of India, chose the position of the road.

== See also ==
- List of things named after Sheikh Mujibur Rahman
- List of artistic depictions of Sheikh Mujibur Rahman
