= Pralayollas =

Revolutionary Bengali song

Pralaẏōllāsa
English: The Ecstasy of Destruction
- Pralayollas প্রলয়োল্লাস
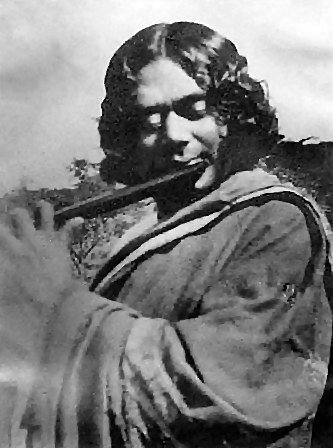
- Kazi Nazrul Islam, composer of the song
- Lyrics: Kazi Nazrul Islam, 1921
- Music: Kazi Nazrul Islam, 1921

Pralayollas (Bengali: প্রলয়োল্লাস, romanized: Pralaẏōllāsa, The Ecstasy of Destruction or Destructive Euphoria), also known after its first line as Tora sab jayadbhani kar, is a popular revolutionary Bengali song set to Dadra Tala, whose lyrics and tune were written by national poet Kazi Nazrul Islam in 1921. It was the first revolutionary Bengali poem collected in early 1922 in a volume titled Agnibeena: the first anthology of Nazrul's poems. The song is the slogan song of Bangladesh Awami League, one of the main political parties of Bangladesh.

== Lyrics ==
Bengali

তোরা সব জয়ধ্বনী কর!
তোরা সব জয়ধ্বনী কর!
ঐ নতুনের কেতন ওরে কাল- বোশেখীর ঝড়।
তোরা সব জয়ধ্বনী কর!
তোরা সব জয়ধ্বনী কর!

আসছে এবার অনাগত প্রলয়- নেশার নৃত্য পাগল
সিন্ধুপারের সিংহ- দ্বারে ধমক হেনে ভাংল আগল।
মৃত্যু- গহন অন্ধ-কুপে
মহাকালের চন্ড- রূপে-
ধুম-ধুপে
বজ্র-শিখার মশাল জ্বেলে আসছে ভয়ংকর-
ওরে ঐ হাসছে ভয়ংকর।
তোরা সব জয়ধ্বনী কর!
তোরা সব জয়ধ্বনী কর!

দ্বাদশ রবির বহ্নি-জ্বালা ভয়াল তাহার নয়ন- কটায়,
দিগন্তরের কাঁদন লুটায় পিঞ্জল তার ত্রস্ত জটায়।
বিন্দু তাহার নয়ন জলে
সপ্ত মহাসিন্ধু দোলে
কপোল-তলে।
বিশ্ব-মায়ের আসন তারি বিপুল বাহুর' পর-
হাঁকে ঐ জয় প্রলয়ংকর!"
তোরা সব জয়ধ্বনী কর!
তোরা সব জয়ধ্বনী কর!

মাভৈঃ, মাভৈঃ! জগৎ জুড়ে প্রলয় এবার ঘনিয়ে আসে।
জরায় মরা মুমুর্ষদের প্রান-লুকানো ঐ বিনাশে।
এবার মহা নিশার শেষে
আসবে উষা অরুণ হেসে
করুণ বেশে।
দিগম্বরের জটায় লুটায় শিশু চাঁদের কর,
আলো তার ভরবে এবার ঘর!
তোরা সব জয়ধ্বনী কর!
তোরা সব জয়ধ্বনী কর!।।

Transliteration

Tora sob Joyodhoni kor!
Tora sob Joyodhoni kor!
Oi notuner keton ure Kalboshekhir jhor.
Tora sob Joyodhoni kor!
Tora sob Joyodhoni kor!

Asche ebar onagoto proloy neshar nrityo pagol,
Shinduparer Shingho -dhare dhomok hene vanglo agol.
Mrittu gohon ondho kupe,
Mohakaler Chondra-rupe,
Dhume dhupe
Bajra-Sikhar moshal jele asce voyongkor,
ore oi hasche voyongkor.
Tora sob Joyodhoni kor!
Tora sob Joyodhoni kor!

Dbhados robir bonhi-jhala voyal tahar noyon kotay.
Digantarer kadon lutay prinjal tar trosthro jotay.
Bindu tahar noyon jhole
Sapto Moha-Shindhu dhole
Kapol- tole.
Bishya -Mayer ason tahar bipul bahu'r por.
Tora sob Joyodhoni kor!
Tora sob Joyodhoni kor!

Mavaih, mavaih! Jagot jure pralay ebar ghoniye ase.
Jhoray mora mumurshoder pran lukano oi binashe.
Ebar Moha nishar seshe
Asbe usha arun hese
Karun beshe.
Digambarer jotay lutay sishu chader koro,
Alo tar vorbe ebar ghar.
Tora sob joyodhoni kor!
Tora sob joyodhoni kor!

English translation

All of you cheer Joy!
All of you cheer Joy!
The new flag flies like that Nor'westers.
All of you cheer Joy!
All of you cheer Joy!

The coming cataclysm is coming - the dance of intoxication is crazy.
The fence was broken by a threat at the gate of the sea shore.
Death - in the deep blind well,
In the form of Chanda of the great age,
In the smoke of incense-
The torch of lightning is burning terribly-
Oh, that smile is terrible.
All of you cheer Joy!
All of you cheer Joy!

The fire of the twelfth sun burns,
the terrible is in his eyes,
Horizon's tears flowed,
Pinjal braided his frightened hair.

The point is in his eyes,
The seven great Indus waves,
Under the forehead.
The seat of the world's mother is after his huge arm.
Shout, Victory is catastrophic! "
All of you cheer Joy!
All of you cheer Joy!

Mavaih, mavaih! The catastrophe is approaching all over the world.
Destruction of the souls of those who died in the womb.
Now at the end of the night,
The morning sun will come laughing,
In a pitiful form.
Digambar's braid looted child moon's lightning,
The light will fill the house!
All of you cheer Joy!
All of you cheer Joy!
