= Bidrohi (poem) =

Revolutionary poem by Kazi Nazrul Islam

- by Kazi Nazrul Islam
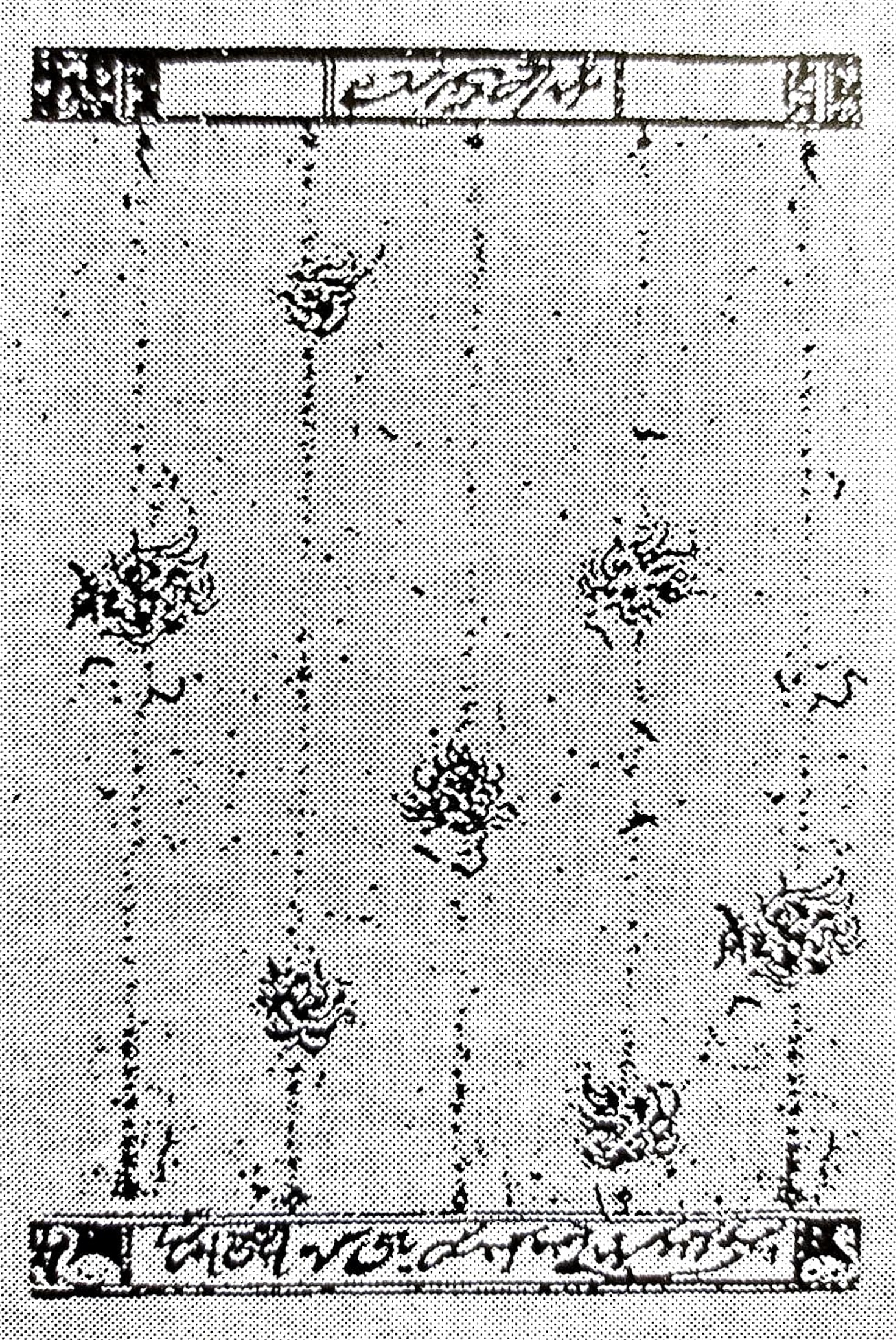
- First edition cover of the book Agnibeena (1922), where the poem was first published.
- Original title: বিদ্রোহী
- Written: December 1921
- First published in: 6 January 1922
- Country: British India
- Language: Bengali
- Subject(s): Rebellion, protest
- Genre: Rebel Poetry
- Publisher: Bijli
- Lines: 139

"Bidrohi" (Bengali: "বিদ্রোহী"; English: "The Rebel") is a popular revolutionary Bengali poem and the most famous poem written by Kazi Nazrul Islam in December 1921. Originally published in several periodicals, the poem was first collected in October 1922 in a volume titled Agnibeena: the first anthology of Nazrul's poems. Many have seen, in this poem, elements of romanticism, heroism, and love. Syed Ali Ahsan wrote that the poem was inspired by Walt Whitman's "Song of Myself".

== Literary style ==
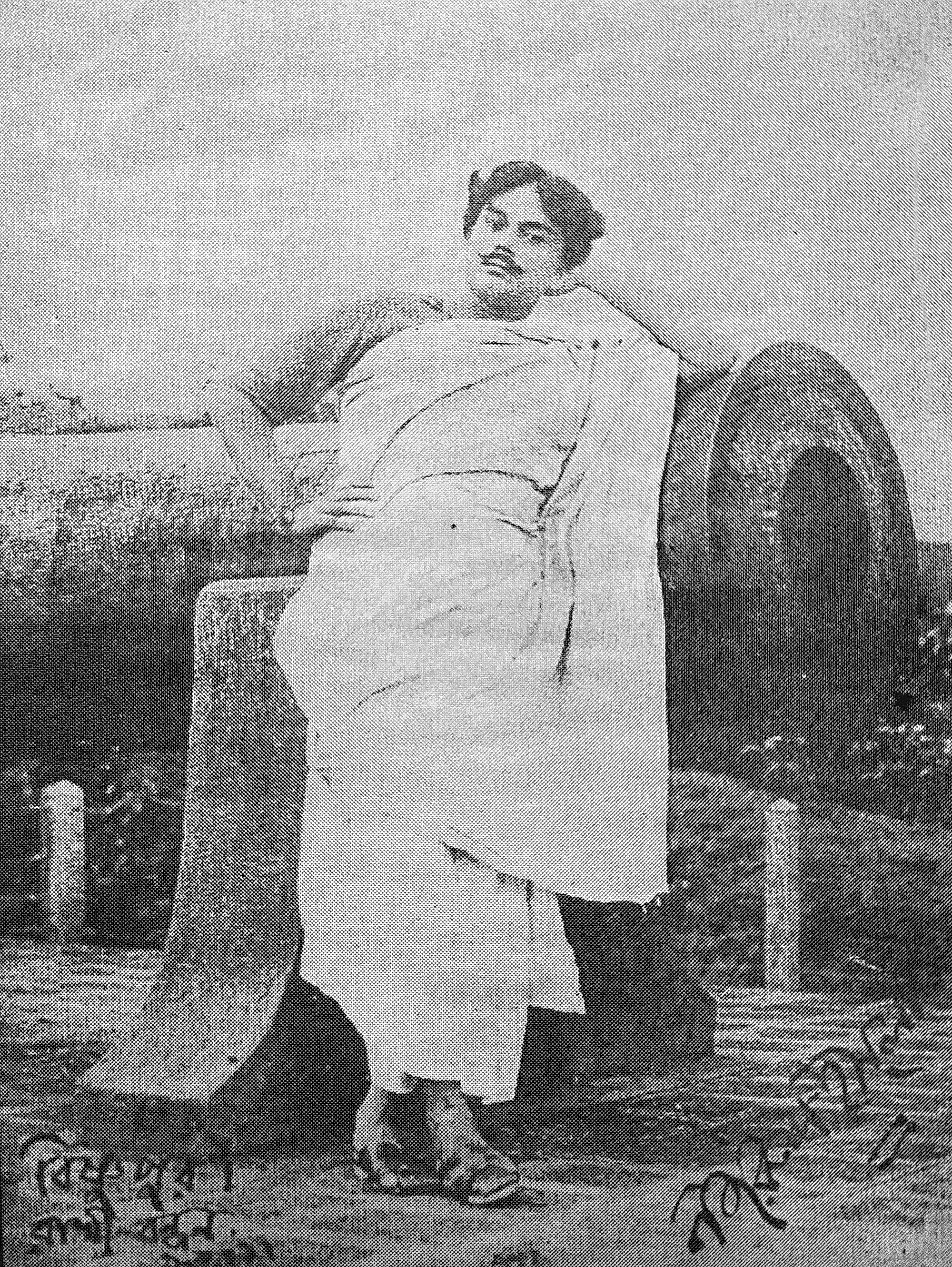
A young Nazrul, writer of the poem, in front of the Dalmadal Cannon in Bishnupur, Bankura.

This poem, through which Nazrul celebrated human creative powers, asserted his affirmation of the individual human capacity for heroic action and human unity and solemnly called for rebellion against all forms of oppression (including that of the British in India) elevated him to the status of a national figure. He included literary elements from Hindu, Islamic and Greek mythology in this poem.

== Publication history ==
Upon returning from the First World War in 1919, Nazrul started living in Kolkata along with his close friend Muzaffar Ahmed. In December 1921, while they were living at Taltala Lane in Kolkata, Nazrul wrote the poem. According to Muzaffar Ahmed, the poem was first published on 6 January 1922 in weekly Bijli Magazine. Upon its release, the poem gained widespread popularity and some other magazines also published the poem including The Moslem Bharat, Prabashi, Modhumati, and Shadhana magazine.

The poem was first collected in October 1922 along with other 11 poems in the book Agneebina published from Arya Publishing House.

== 100 Years celebration ==
2021 marked the 100th year of the poem. The poem's centennial was celebrated around the world including Bangladesh and West Bengal.

== Few lines from Bidrohi ==
I am the unutterable grief,

I am the trembling first touch of the virgin,
I am the throbbing ten,
I am the wild fire of the woods,
I am Hell's mad terrific sea of wrath!
I ride on the wings of lightning with joy and profundity,
I scatter misery and fear all around,
I bring earth-quakes on this world! “(8th stanza)”

=== Last stanza ===
Weary of struggles, I, the great rebel,
Shall rest in quiet only when I find
The sky and the air free of the piteous groans of the oppressed.
Only when the battle fields are cleared of jingling bloody sabres
Shall I, weary of struggles, rest in quiet,
I am the rebel eternal,
I raise my head beyond this world and ,

High, ever erect and alone! “(Last stanza)” (English translation by Kabir Choudhary)

== Popular culture ==
This poem is directly referenced by the 1995 song Rebel Warrior by Asian Dub Foundation.

It was also referenced in the 2024 book, “This Book Won’t Burn” by Samira Ahmed (p. 3).
