= Nazrul Jayanti =

Birthday of Kazi Nazrul Islam

Nazrul Jayanti নজরুল জয়ন্তী
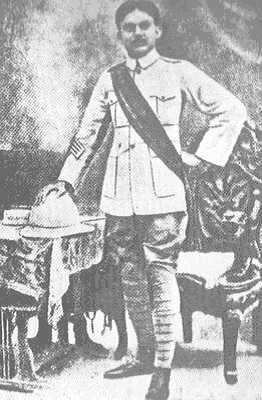
- Official name: Nazrul Janma Jayanti
- Observed by: Bangladesh; India
- Frequency: Annually

Nazrul Jayanti (Bengali: নজরুল জয়ন্তী) is the birthday of Kazi Nazrul Islam the national poet of Bangladesh on 25 May. The day is organized and celebrated by various schools, colleges and universities of Bengal, and by Bengalis around the world, as a tribute to Nazrul and his works. (Note: Multiple references:)

== See also ==
- List of festivals in Bangladesh
- List of festivals in West Bengal
