= Patalpuri =

1935 Bengali film

- Directed by: Priyanath Gangopadhyay
- Produced by: Kali films
- Starring: Jiban Gangopadhyay; Maya Mukhopadhyay
- Music by: Kazi Nazrul Islam
- Release date: 1935
- Country: India
- Language: Bengali

Patalpuri is a Bengali romantic drama film directed by Priyanath Gangopadhyay and released in 1935 under the banner of Kali films. Poet Kazi Nazrul Islam was the music director of the film.

== Plot ==
This is the love story of Tumni and Mungra. As Tumni's father opposes their marriage, she fled and went live with Mungra as husband and wife in a coal field industry. One lady Bilashi tries to seduce Mungra and they become close. Bilasi and Tuimni get involved in a love triangle. After an accident in the coal mine, Mungra was framed for offence and sentenced to jail for two years. After release from prison he realizes that he still loves Tumni but did not find her.

== Cast ==
- Jiban Gangopadhyay
- Tinkari Chakraborty
- Maya Mukhopadhyay
- Paresh Bose
- Kamala Jhariya
