= List of works by Kazi Nazrul Islam =

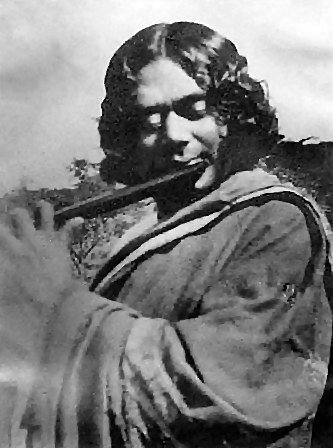
Kazi Nazrul Islam

This is a complete listing of the works by Kazi Nazrul Islam, in the Bengali language.

== Poetry ==
- Agnibeena (The Fiery Lute), 1922
- Sanchita (Collected poems), 1925
- Phanimanasa (The Cactus), 1927
- Chakrabak (The Flamingo), 1929
- Satbhai Champa (The Seven Brothers of Champa), juvenile poems, 1933
- Nirjhar (Fountain), 1939
- Natun Chand (The New Moon), 1939
- Morubhaskar (The Sun in the Desert), 1951
- Sanchayan (Collected Poems), 1955
- Nazrul Islam: Islami Kobita (A Collection of Islamic Poems; Dhaka, Bangladesh: Islamic Foundation, 1982)

== Poems and songs ==
- Bidrohi in Agnibeena collection of 12 poems (1921)
- Dolan Chapa (name of a faintly fragrant monsoon flower), 1923
- Bisher Bashi (The Poison Flute), 1924
- Bhangar Gan (The Song of Destruction), 1924 proscribe in 1924
- Chhayanat (The Raga of Chhayanat), 1925
- Chittanama (On Chittaranjan), 1925
- Samyabadi (The Proclaimer of Equality), 1926
- Puber Hawa (The Eastern Wind), 1926
- Sarbahara (The Proletariat), 1926
- Sindhu Hindol (The Undulation of the Sea), 1927
- Jinjir (Chain), 1928
- Pralaya Shikha (Doomsday Flame), 1930 proscribed in 1930
- Shesh Saogat (The Last Offerings), 1958

== Prose ==
=== Short stories ===
- Bathar Daan (Offering of Pain), 1922
- Rikter Bedon (The Sorrows of Destitute), 1925
- Shiulimala (Garland of Shiuli) 1931
- Padmagokhra ()
- Ognigiri (The Volcano)
- Jiner Badsha (The King of the Jinns)

=== Novels ===
- Bandhan Hara (Free from Bonds), 1927
- Mrityukshuda (Hunger for Death), 1930
- Kuhelika (Mystery), 1931

== Plays and drama ==
- Jhilimili (Window Shutters), plays, 1930
- Aleya (Mirage), song drama, 1931
- Putuler Biye (Doll's Marriage), children's play, 1933
- Madhumala (Garland of Honeysuckle) a musical play, 1960
- Jhar (Storm), juvenile poems and play, 1960
- Pile Patka Putuler Biye (Doll's Marriage), juvenile poems and play, 1964
- Shilpi (Artist)

== Essays ==
- Joog Bani (The Message of the Age), 1926
- Jhinge Phul (The Cucurbitaccus Flower), 1926
- Durdiner Jatri (The Traveller through Rough Times), 1926
- Rudra Mangal (The Violent Good), 1927
- Dhumketu (The Comet), 1961
