= Dhumketu (magazine) =

- Front page of the first issue
- Editor: Kazi Nazrul Islam
- Frequency: Bi-weekly
- First issue: August 11, 1922
- Final issue: March 1923
- Country: India (British Raj)
- Language: Bengali

Dhumketu (Bengali: ধূমকেতু dhūmkētu, "comet") was a bi-weekly magazine edited by Kazi Nazrul Islam which was first published on 11 August 1922. The magazine was started with a four-page format, later elaborated to eight pages. The last issue of the magazine was published in March 1923. Many of the popular poems of Nazrul including Anandamoyeer Agamane, Dhumketu etc. were published in this magazine. Sarat Chandra Chattopadhyay also contributed to the magazine.

== Editorial board ==
Kazi Nazrul Islam edited several special issues of the magazine including the Muharram issue in August 1922, the Agamani issue on 26 September 1922, the Puja issue on 22 September 1922, the Diwali issue on 20 October 1922, and the Congress issue on 27 December 1922. While Nazrul was in jail, Biren Sen Gupta and Amaresh Kanji Lal edited the magazine.

== Anti-British publication ==
In the Puja issue of the Dhumketu magazine published on 22 September 1922, Nazrul wrote an anti-British political poem named Anandamoyeer Agamane (English:The Advent of the Delightful Mother). On 23 January 1923, Nazrul was arrested by the police of the Bengal Presidency on charge of sedition for his statements in the poem. Nazrul demanded complete freedom from the British government in the poem. Following the arrest, the 27 January 1923 issue of the paper was named as the Nazrul issue. After this issue, the publication was temporarily suspended. Later, it was published again with Biren Sen Gupta and Amaresh Kanji Lal as the editors.

After the arrest, Nazrul was transferred to Hooghly Jail from Presidency Jail. He was sentenced to one year imprisonment by the government. While in jail, Nazrul and his co-prisoners started an indefinite fast as a protest against the Bengal Police administration's atrocities and oppression that lasted for 39 days. Rabindranath Tagore sent a telegram to Nazrul and requested him to give up his fast, saying, "Give up hunger strike. Our literature claims you". Nazrul was released from jail on 15 December 1923.

== Fate ==
The revolutionary fervor of the magazine decreased after the arrest of Nazrul, and its circulation declined as a result. Publication became irregular, and completely stopped by March 1923.
