= Shahid Zia Shishu Park, Rajshahi =

Children's amusement park in Rajshahi

Shahid Zia Shishu Park; শহীদ জিয়া শিশু পার্ক
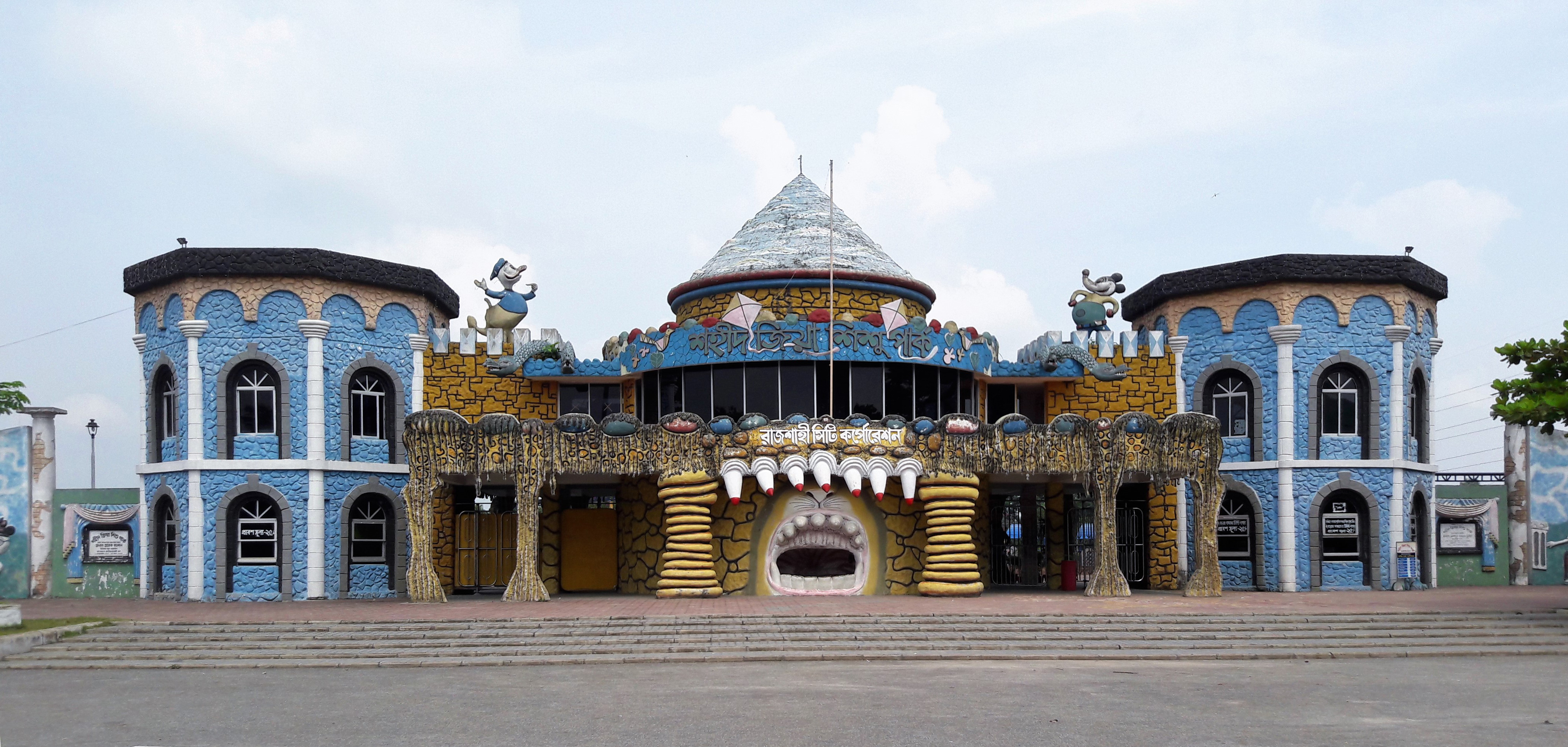
- Main entrance of the Shahid Zia Shishu Park
- Location: Nawdapara, Rajshahi
- Coordinates: 24.3988°N 88.6120°E
- Opened: 2006
- Operated by: Rajshahi City Corporation
- Area: 12.21 acres (4.94 ha)

Shahid Zia Shishu Park is one the entertainment centers of the Rajshahi, located at Boro Bangram, Nawdapara, Rajshahi district, Bangladesh.

== History ==
The park is named after Ziaur Rahman, the 7th president of Bangladesh. In 1995, Rajshahi City Corporation undertook a project to build an amusement park in the city. On February 9, 2005, foundation stone was laid, although the construction work of the park started one year before. The park was opened to the public on February 1, 2006, on a trial basis, and officially inaugurated on February 25, 2006, by Abdul Mannan Bhuiyan, the then Minister for Local Government, Rural Development and Cooperatives. 110 million+ BDT was spent on the construction of the park.

== Features ==
The amusement park features 70 types of games to play of 19 items. Items include Merry-Go-Round, Mini Railcar, Monorail Sky Bike, Flum Rides, Octopus, Super Swing, Bumper Car, Bumper Boat, Kiddie Rides, Physiological Games, 3D Movie Theater, Pedal Boat, Bouncey Castle, Horse Ride, Horse Ride Swing, paratrooper, tea cup and battery car. Artificial hills on the artificial lake along with two bridges on either side of the Mini Railcar to go through these hills have been built for enhancing beauty of the park. Two-storey office building features an attractive entrance with various faces of animals and igloo. The exit gate resembles an octopus.

== Gallery ==
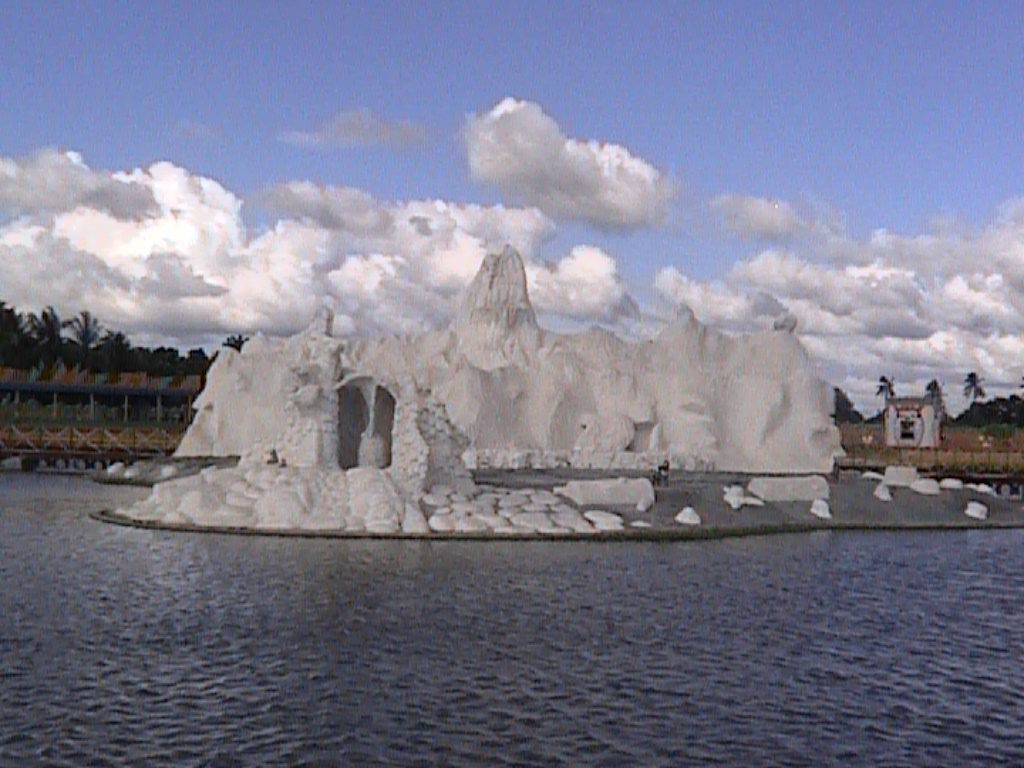
Manmade islands at the Shahid Zia Shishu Park

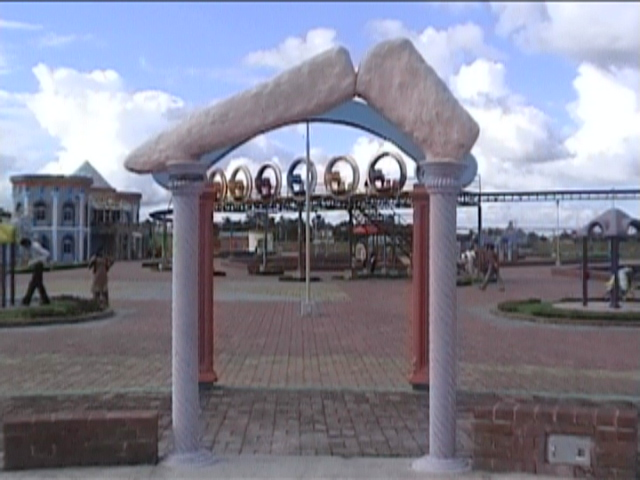
Rides at the park

== See also ==
- Puthia Rajbari
- Choto Sona Mosque
