= Agnibeena =

Collection of poems by Kavi Nazrul

Agnibeena অগ্নিবীণা
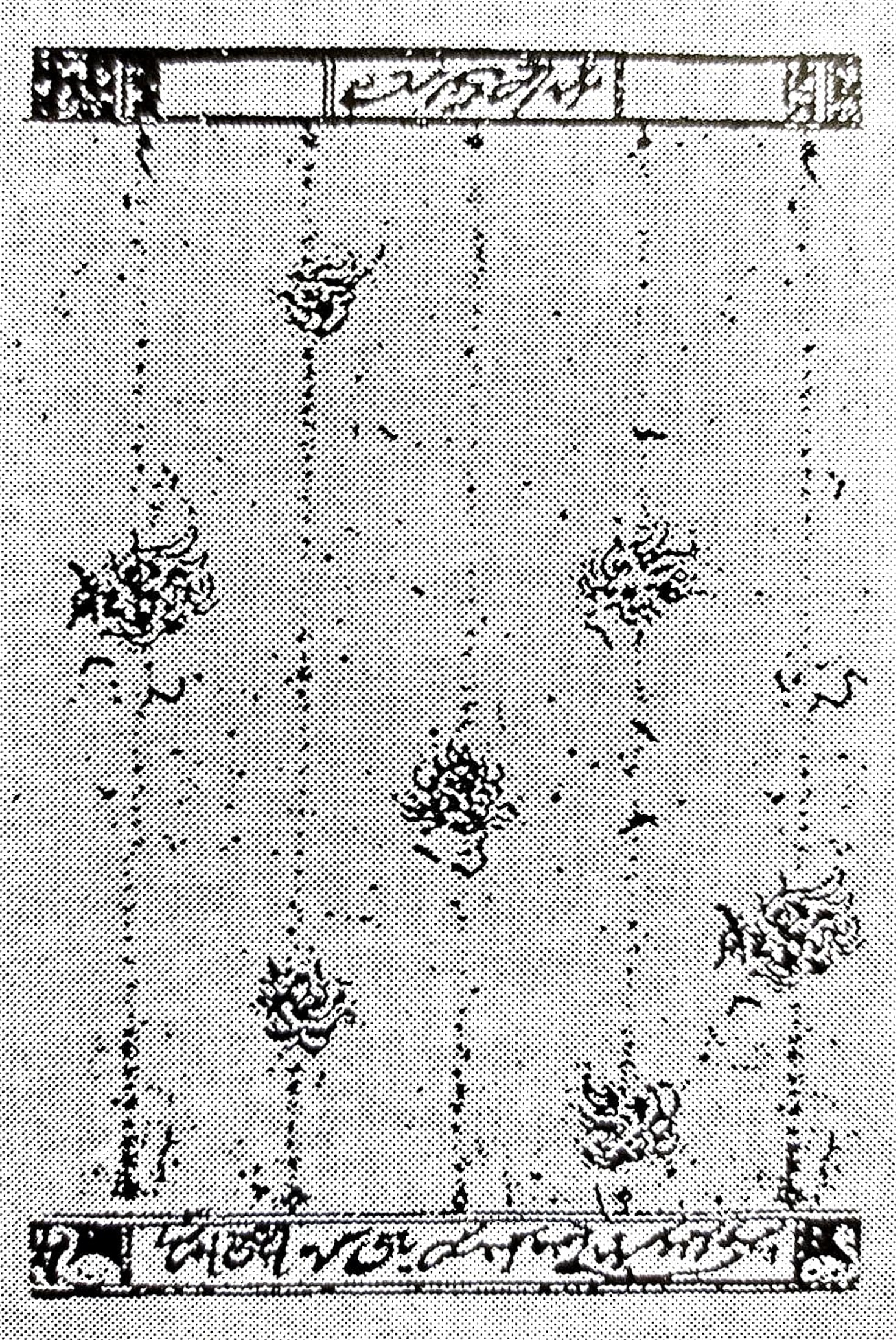
- Cover of the first edition by Abanindranath Tagore
- Author: Kazi Nazrul Islam
- Cover artist: Abanindranath Tagore
- Language: Bengali
- Genre: Poem
- Published: October 1922
- Publisher: Arya Publishing House (1st and 2nd edition); Noor Library, Publishers (3rd edition); Nazrul Institute (republication of 3rd edition in Bangladesh)
- Publication place: British India
- ISBN: 984-555-309-5

Agnibeena (Bengali: অগ্নিবীণা) is the first poetry book written by Kazi Nazrul Islam, one of the most famous Bengali poets of the first half of the 20th century. It was published in the month of Kartik in the Bengali year 1329 (October 1922). There are twelve poems in this book.

== List of poems ==
Agnibeena contains a preface, where Nazrul dedicated the book to Barindra Kumar Ghosh, and 12 poems. The most famous poem of this book is "Bidrohi" (lit. "the rebel").

- "Pralayollas"
- "Bidrohi"
- "Raktambor-Dharini Ma"
- "Agamoni"
- "Dhumketu"
- "Kamal Pasha"
- "Anwar"
- "Ranobheri"
- "Shat-el-Arab"
- "Kheyaparer Taroni"
- "Qurbani"
- "Muharram"
