= Gangachara Bridge, Rangpur =

Bridge in Bangladesh

Gangachara Bridge, Rangpur গঙ্গাচড়া সেতু
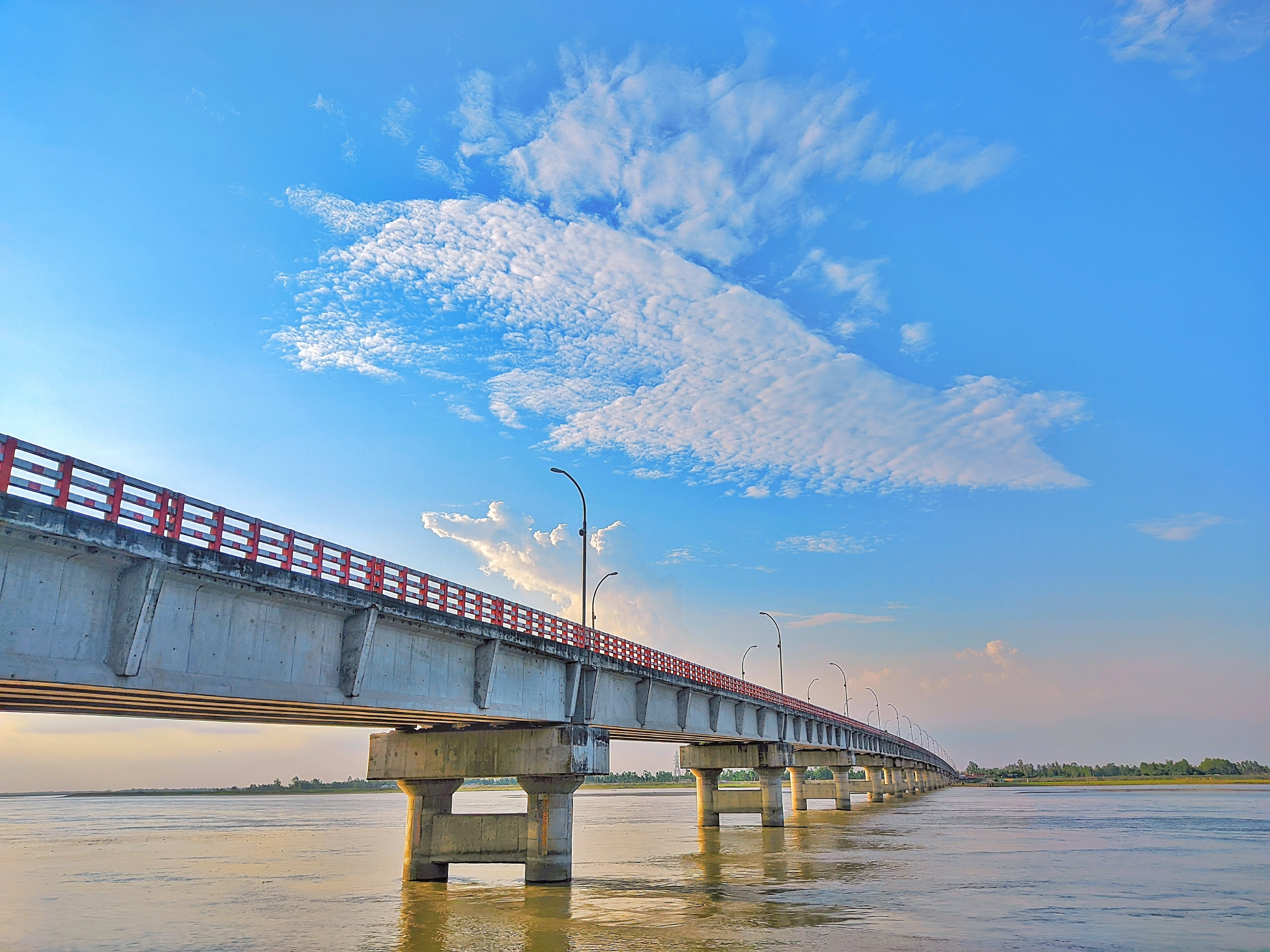
- Coordinates: 25.86884°N 89.25521°E
- Locale: Gangachara, Rangpur

Characteristics
- Total length: 650 m
- Width: 12.1 m
- No. of spans: 15

Gangachara Bridge (Bengali: গংগাচড়া সেতু) is located on the river Teesta on the Lalmonirhat-Rangpur highway in Gangachara Upazila of Rangpur District, Bangladesh. The construction work of the bridge lasted from 2007 to June 2012. The bridge was inaugurated by Prime Minister Sheikh Hasina on 20 September 2012. The bridge is 650 metres (2,130 ft) long and 12.1 m (40 ft) wide. The bridge is made of 16 individual spans on 16 pillars. The total cost of construction of the bridge is 1.2209 billion taka. The width of the river is 60 metres (200 ft). The approach road is 2.29 km (1.42 mi).
