= Hans Hoff (psychiatrist) =

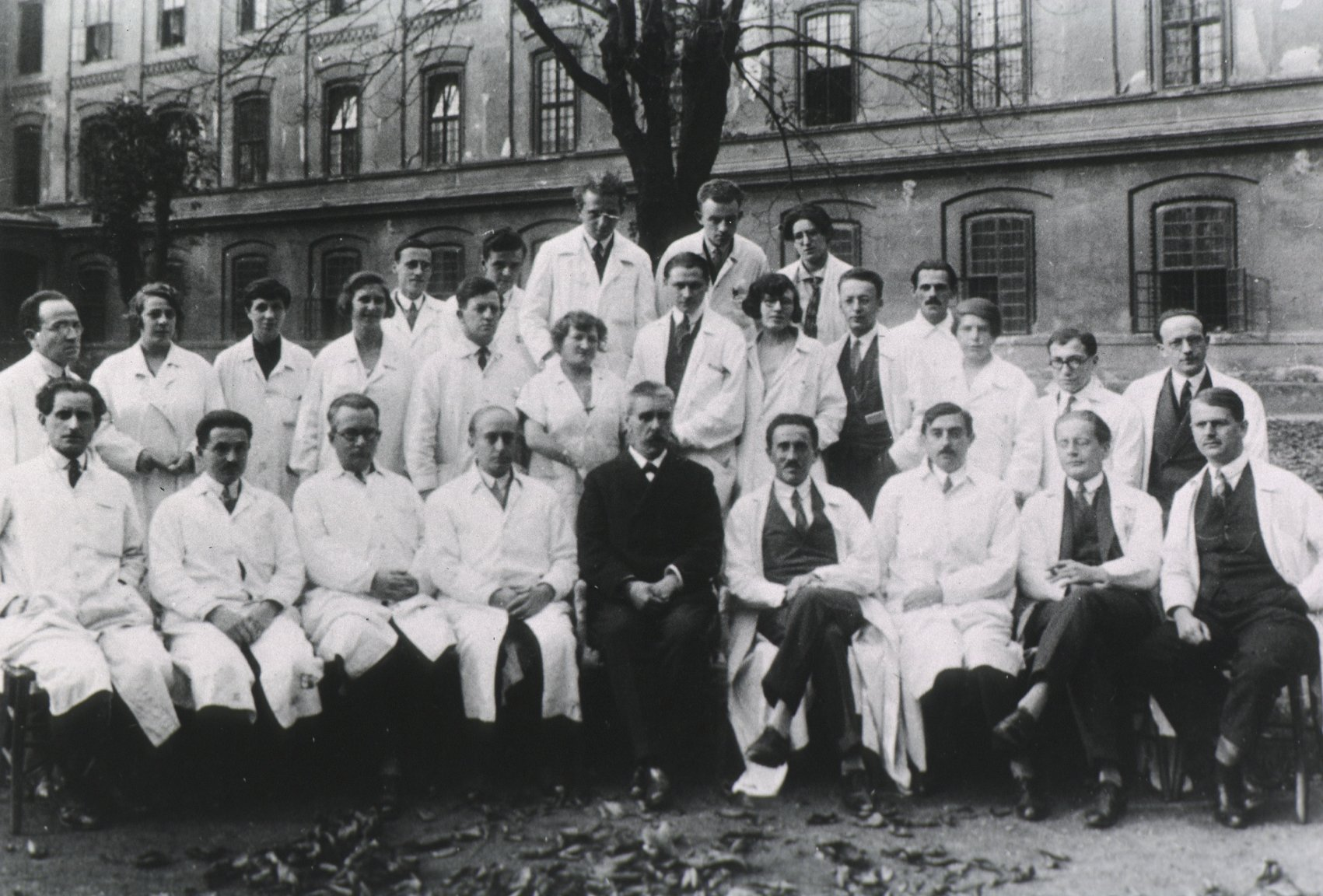
- Group of doctors to Julius Wagner-Jauregg, Vienna 1927. Hans Hoff in the 2nd row, second from right.
- Born: 11 December 1897; Vienna, Austria
- Died: 23 August 1969 (aged 71); Vienna, Austria
- Occupations: Psychiatrist and Neurologist
- Known for: Doctor to Ne Win and Kazi Nazrul Islam

Hans Hoff (11 December 1897 – 23 August 1969) was an Austrian psychiatrist and neurologist.

== Life ==
After completing his medical studies at the University of Vienna in 1918 Hoff worked as assistant physician (1922–1927) and as an assistant (1928–1932) at the clinic under Julius Wagner-Jauregg. In 1932 he became a private lecturer and specialist in psychiatry and neurology. In 1936 he was appointed to the board of the Department of Neurology clinic in Vienna.

After the annexation of Austria to Germany, Hoff had to leave the country. He emigrated to Iraq, where he became professor of neurology and psychiatry at the Royal Medical School in Baghdad was. After moving to the United States (1942), he became an assistant professor at Columbia University in New York. From 1943 to 1945, Hoff performed military service in the Middle East and visited Afghanistan and Iran on behalf of the US government. After the war Hoff worked at the Goldwater Memorial Hospital and at Columbia University in New York. In 1949 he returned to Austria, under an initiative of the Vienna City Councilor Viktor Matejka. He first took over the management of the hospital at Rose Hill, from 1950 he was Head of the University Department of Psychiatry and Neurology at the University of Vienna, also called "Hoff Hospital". In the academic year 1961/62 he was Dean, in the academic year 1962/63 Prodekan of the University of Vienna.

== Work ==
Hoff wrote more than 500 papers on psychiatry and neurology, including ten books. In his scientific work, he focused on experimental encephalitis studies, postural reflexes, psychosomatic problems, the influence of hypnotic orders on gastric and intestinal function, the psycho-vegetative circuit, the influence of endocrine glands by psychological factors, and the function of the hypothalamus, the central nervous system, of the metabolism and the endocrine glands, brain pathological phenomena, the function of the frontal, thalamic and cerebellum, time lapse phenomena, nervous vascular regulation, sleep studies, adrenal disturbances in infectious diseases, epilepsy, multiple sclerosis, psychopathy, and alcoholism.

In addition to his scientific research, Hoff did pioneer work with his educational and enlightening work. He distinguished himself by lively lectures in medical circles and in the context of popular education. Hoff found a new method for the rehabilitation of alcoholics and developed a special psychotherapy for criminals. Hoff is the founder of the Viennese Psychiatric School, whose first concern was to establish the humanization of the clinics to ensure the dignity of the mentally ill.

== Awards ==
- 1957: Great Silver Decoration of Honour for Services to the Republic of Austria.

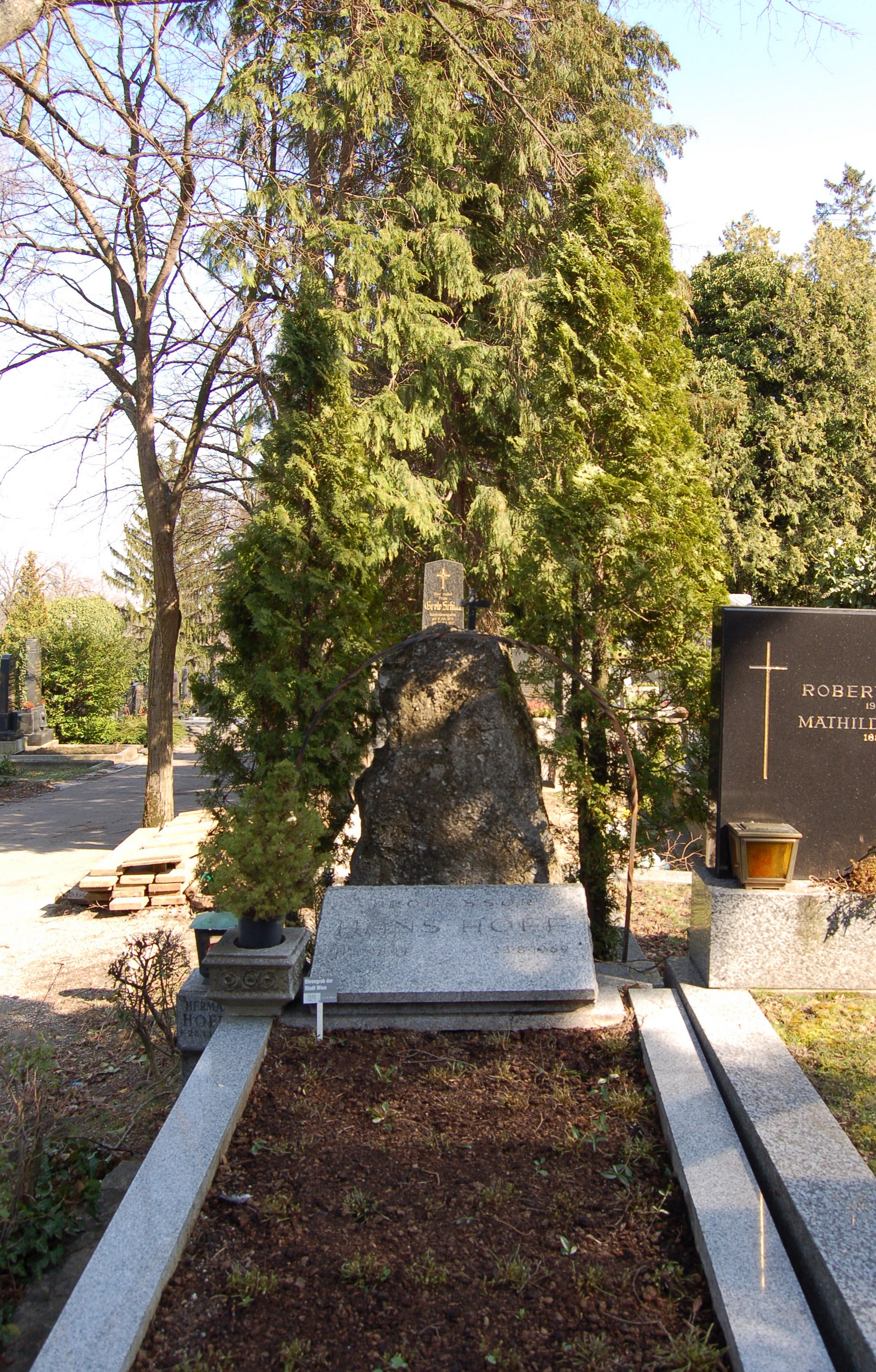
Tomb of Hans Hoff in the Neustift cemetery

== Literature ==
Hans Hoff, in: Judith Bauer Měřínský: The impact of the annexation of Austria by the German Reich on the medical faculty of the University of Vienna in 1938: biographies of dismissed professors and lecturers . Vienna: Diss., 1980, pp. 103–106b. Jantsch, Marlene: Hoff, Hans. In: New German Biography (NDB). Volume 9, Duncker & Humblot, Berlin 1972, ISBN 3-428-00190-7, p. 383
