= Gopalganj Government College =

Coordinates: 23.0068°N 89.8281°E

- গোপালগঞ্জ সরকারি কলেজ
- Former name: Govt. Bangabandhu College
- Type: Government College
- Established: 1950
- Affiliations: National University
- Principal: Wahid Alam Laskar
- Students: 20,000
- Location: Bangabandhu Town Road, 8140, Bangladesh
- Campus: 5.67
- Language: Bengali
- Founding Principal: Pabitra Kumar Das Gupta
- Website: https://www.gbc.edu.bd

Gopalganj Government College (Bengali: গোপালগঞ্জ সরকারি কলেজ) is a college in the southwest Bangladesh. It is located in Gopalganj.

== History ==
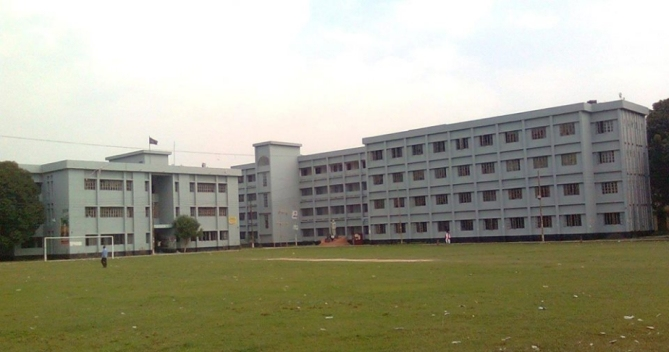
Campus of Govt Bangabandhu College

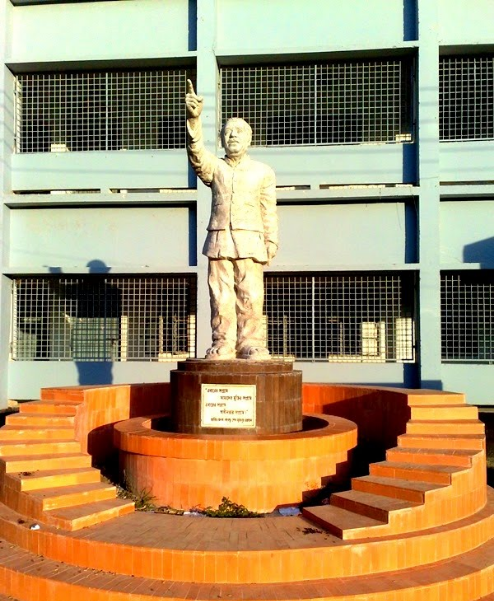
Bangabandhu Sculpture

The people of Gopalganj collected donations to fund the college. Khawaja Nazimuddin, the then Governor of Pakistan, once visited. He received a sizeable money gift. However, Sheikh Mujibur Rahman demanded that the money be used to establish a college, which the Governor accepted. At that time, two educational institutions operated in Gopalganj: Sitanath Academy and Mathuranath Institute. Mathuranath was then situated where Bangabandhu College was founded. Sitanath Academy and Mathuranath Institution merged to become Sitanath-Mathuranath Model School. In 1950, a college was established Quid-e-Azam Memorial College. After the Liberation War of Bangladesh, the college was renamed Bangabandhu Mahavidyalaya. On 1 April 1974, government nationalized the college and the name became Government Bangabandhu College.

After the fall of the Sheikh Hasina led Awami League government, Government Bangabandhu College was renamed to Gopalganj Government College by the Muhammad Yunus led Interim government.

== Curriculum ==
From the beginning, the college ran two courses: I.Arts and I.Commerce. In 1958, it added Bachelor's degrees. In 1970, it added B.Science. In 1996, it added B.Commerce Currently, the college is providing HSC, BA, B.Commerce, B.Science, MA, M.Commerce and M,Science degree.

=== Honours courses ===
- Accounting
- Bangla
- Botany
- Economics
- English
- History
- Islamic History and Culture
- Islamic Studies
- Management
- Mathematics
- Philosophy
- Physics
- Political Science

=== Master's courses ===
- Bangla
- Economics
- English
- History
- Islamic History and Culture
- Physics
- Political Science

=== Degree courses ===
- B. A. (Pass)
- B. Sc. (Pass)
- B. B. S. (Pass)

== Activities ==
Saraswati Puja is observed every year in the college temple. Nabinbaran is conducted to welcome new students.
