= Shakun =

Shakun is both a given name and a surname. Notable people with the name include:

- Shakun Batra (born 1983), Indian film director and screenwriter
- Anatoliy Shakun (born 1948), Soviet football midfielder and coach
