= Bangladesh Nazrul Sena =

Organization logo and emblem.

The Bangladesh Nazrul Sena (Bangladesh Nazrul Army) is an NGO working for the education, health and upliftment of children, adolescents and young adults in Bangladesh. It is named after famous Bengali poet, writer and musician Kazi Nazrul Islam, whose philosophy has inspired the purpose and mission of the organization.

== Foundation ==
The Bangladesh Nazrul Sena was founded in 1964 in Bangladesh (then East Pakistan). Its activities were curtailed during the Bangladesh Liberation War and the Indo-Pakistani War of 1971, but began rapidly growing following the independence of Bangladesh. It was inspired by the philosophy of Kazi Nazrul Islam, who is regarded as the "national poet" of Bangladesh. The organization seeks to combat child abuse, injustice and discrimination of children and young people based on socio-economic background, religion, poverty, birth, sex, health and handicaps.

== Activities ==
Governed by a central committee of trustees and board members, the Bangladesh Nazrul Sena has 35 branches and chapters across Bangladesh, through which it sponsors initiatives and programmes for healthcare and education for Bangladeshi youth. It works with public schools, kindergarten schools and orphanages to provide care and support for the development of children and young adults. The organization also supports many volunteer activities and programmes.

== Nazrul Sena School ==
The organization has also established the Nazrul Sena School, which is a well-known kindergarten school in Mymensingh. It was established in 1990, and is directly monitored by Bangladesh Nazrul Sena. G. E. M. Faruque, a key official of the organization, is the founder and the current principal of the school. Nazrul Sena school has more than 200 students, 18 full-time teachers and 5 other staff members. Students of the school are always busy with their education and also involved in cultural activities like music, dance, drawing, sports, debating, speech and other social activities. The school started education using multimedia computer software for the first time in Myemsingh and amongst the first in Bangladesh. Every year the school arranges picnics, study tours, annual sports, cultural competitions, annual prize-giving ceremony. Every year, the students organize a Multimedia Computer Show. In the fair, the students exhibit how much they learn from computer multimedia software.
