= Bangabandhu Boulevard =

Avenue in Turkey

Coordinates: 39.8779126°N 32.6880429°E

Bangabandhu Boulevard (Turkish: Bangabandhu Bulvarı) is an boulevard in Ankara, Turkey. In 1997, the avenue was named after Bangabandhu Sheikh Mujibur Rahman.

The first given name of the avenue was Bangabandhu Şeyh Muciburrahman Boulevard. On November 9, 2020, the name was shortened by the city council of Ankara. There is a sculpture of Bangabandhu.
