= Kazi Nazrul Islam =

Bengali poet, writer and musician (1899–1976)

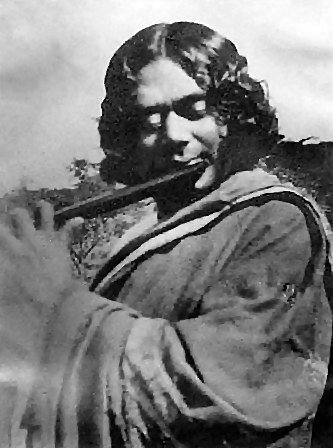
- Kazi Nazrul Islam in 1926, Chittagong
- Pronunciation: [kad͡ʒi nod͡ʒɾul islam]
- Born: 24 May 1899; Churulia, Asansol, Bengal Presidency, British India
- Died: 29 August 1976 (aged 77); Dacca, Bangladesh
- Resting place: Mausoleum of Kazi Nazrul Islam; 23.7351°N 90.3950°E
- Other names: Dukhu Mia, Rebel Poet
- Citizenship: British India (1899 – 1947); India (1947 – 1976); Bangladesh (1976)
- Occupations: Poet; short-story writer; journalist; lyricist; musician
- Years active: 1920–1942
- Works: Bibliography; discography
- Political party: Workers and Peasants Party
- Movement: Bengali Renaissance
- Criminal charges: Sedition
- Criminal penalty: 3-month imprisonment
- Spouses: Nargis Ashar Khanam (m. 1921; div. 1937) Pramila Devi (m. 1924; died 1962) (Note: Birth name Ashalata Sengupta.)
- Children: 4, including Kazi Sabyasachi
- Family: Kazi family of Churulia
- Awards: Jagattarini Medal (1945); Padma Bhushan (1960); Ekushey Padak (1976); Independence Award (1977)
- Writing career
- Other names: Dukhumian, Tarakkhyapa
- Pen name: Dhūmketu
- Language: Bengali; Urdu; Persian; Arabic
- Period: Modern
- Genres: Short story; novel; essay; poem; ghazal; song
- Subjects: Revolution; freedom; humanism; communism; secularism; justice; women's rights; love
- Notable works: Notuner Gaan; Bidrohi; Pralayollas; Dhumketu; Agnibeena; O Mon Romzaner Oi Rozar Sheshe
- Musical career
- Genres: Nazrul Geeti; Hindustani classical; folk; revolutionary; march; Arabic; Persian; ghazal; hamd; naʽat; Shyama Sangeet
- Instruments: Vocals; harmonium; setar; tabla; flute
- Works: Full list
- Labels: Gramophone Company India; All India Radio
- Formerly of: Leto group
- Military career
- Allegiance: British Raj
- Branch: British Indian Army
- Service years: 1917–1920
- Rank: Havildar (Sergeant)
- Unit: 49th Bengalee Regiment
- Conflicts: World War I

Karar oi louhokopat in the voice of Girin Chakraborty
Lyricist and composer Kazi Nazrul Islam

Kazi Nazrul Islam (Note: Bengali: কাজী নজরুল ইসলাম, pronounced [kad͡ʒi nod͡ʒɾul islam]) (Bengali: [kad͡ʒi nod͡ʒɾul islam]; 24 May 1899 (Note: 11 Joishtho 1306 Bengali year.) – 29 August 1976) was a Bengali poet, short story writer, journalist, lyricist, and musician. He was later honoured with the title of national poet of Bangladesh, on consideration of his liberal attitudes and patriotic zeal." Nazrul produced a large body of poetry, music, messages, novels, and stories with themes that included equality, justice, anti-imperialism, humanity, rebellion against oppression and religious devotion. Nazrul Islam's activism for political and social justice as well as writing a poem titled "Bidrohī", meaning "the rebel" in Bengali, earned him the title of "Bidrohī Kôbi" (Rebel Poet). His compositions form the avant-garde music genre of Nazrul Gīti (Music of Nazrul). (Note: Multiple references:)

Born in the British Raj period into a Bengali Muslim Kazi family from Churulia in Asansol, then in the Burdwan district in the Bengal Presidency (now in West Bengal, India), Nazrul Islam received religious education and as a young man worked as a muezzin at a local mosque. He learned about poetry, drama, and literature while working with the rural theatrical group Leṭor Dôl, Leṭo being a folk song genre of West Bengal usually performed by the people from the Muslim community of the region. He joined the British Indian Army in 1917 and was posted in Karachi. Nazrul Islam established himself as a journalist in Calcutta after the war ended. He criticised the British Raj and called for revolution through his famous poetic works, such as "Bidrohī" ('The Rebel') and "Bhangar Gan" ('The Song of Destruction'), as well as in his publication Dhūmketu ('The Comet'). His nationalist activism in the Indian independence movement led to his frequent imprisonment by the colonial British authorities. While in prison, Nazrul Islam wrote the "Rajbôndīr Jôbanbôndī" ('Deposition of a Political Prisoner'). His writings greatly inspired Bengalis of East Pakistan during the Bangladesh Liberation War.

Nazrul Islam's writings explored themes such as freedom, humanity, love, and revolution. He opposed all forms of bigotry and fundamentalism, including religious, caste-based and gender-based. Nazrul wrote short stories, novels, and essays but is best known for his songs and poems. He introduced the ghazal songs in the Bengali language and is also known for his extensive use of Arabic- and Persian-influenced Bengali words in his works.

Nazrul Islam wrote and composed nearly 4,000 songs—many recorded by the Gramophone Company of India—collectively known as 'Nazrul Gīti'. In 1942, at the age of 43, he began to be affected by an unknown disease, losing his voice and memory. A medical team in Vienna diagnosed the disease as Pick's disease, a rare incurable neurodegenerative disease. The ailing poet was taken to Bangladesh with the consent of the government of India on 24 May 1972, at the invitation of the government of Bangladesh. His family accompanied him and relocated to Dhaka. Later, on 18 February 1976, the citizenship of Bangladesh was conferred upon him. He died on 29 August 1976.

== Early life ==
Nazrul Islam was born during the late British Raj on 24 May 1899 in the village of Churulia, Asansol Sadar, Paschim Bardhaman district of the Bengal Presidency (now in West Bengal, India). He was born into the Bengali Muslim Taluqdar family of Churulia and was the second of three sons and a daughter. Nazrul Islam's father Kazi Faqeer Ahmed was the imam and caretaker of the local Pirpukur mosque and mausoleum of Haji Pahlawan. Nazrul Islam's mother was Zahida Khatun; he had two brothers, Kazi Saahibjaan and Kazi Ali Hussain, and a sister, Umme Kulsum. He was nicknamed Dukhu Miañ (literally, 'the one with grief'). Nazrul Islam studied at a maktab and madrasa, run by a mosque and a dargah, respectively, where he studied the Quran, Hadith, Islamic philosophy, and theology. Following his father's death in 1908, the then 10-year-old Nazrul Islam took his father's place as a caretaker of the mosque to support his family. He also assisted teachers in the school. He later worked as the muezzin at the mosque.

Attracted to folk theatre, Nazrul Islam joined a leto (travelling theatrical group) run by his uncle Fazle Karim. He worked and travelled with them, learning to act, as well as writing songs and poems for the plays and musicals. Through his work and experiences, Nazrul Islam began studying Bengali and Sanskrit literature, as well as Hindu scriptures such as the Puranas. Nazrul Islam composed folk plays for the group, which included Chāshār Shōng ('the drama of a peasant'), and plays about characters from the Mahabharata, including Shokunībōdh ('the Killing of Shakuni'), Rājā Judhisthirer Shōng ('the drama of King Yudhishthira'), Dātā Kōrno ('the philanthropic Karna'), Ākbōr Bādshāh ('Akbar the emperor'), Kobi Kālidās ('poet Kalidas'), Bidyan Hutum ('the learned owl'), and Rājputrer Shōng ('the prince's sorrow').

In 1910, Nazrul Islam left the troupe and enrolled at the Searsole Raj High School in Raniganj. In school, he was influenced by his teacher, a Jugantar activist, Nibaran Chandra Ghatak, and began a lifelong friendship with fellow author Sailajananda Mukhopadhyay, who was his classmate. He later transferred to the Mathrun High English School, studying under the headmaster and poet Kumud Ranjan Mullick. Unable to continue paying his school fees, Nazrul Islam left the school and joined a group of kaviyals. Later he took jobs as a cook at Wahid Confectionery, a well-known bakery of the region, and at a tea stall in the town of Asansol. In 1914, Nazrul Islam studied at the Darirampur School (now Govt. Nazrul Academy) in Trishal, Mymensingh District. Amongst other subjects, Nazrul Islam studied Bengali, Sanskrit, Arabic, Persian literature and Hindustani classical music under teachers who were impressed by his dedication and skill.

Nazrul Islam studied up to grade 10 but did not appear for the matriculation pre-test examination; instead, in 1917, he joined the British Indian Army at the age of eighteen. He had two primary motivations for joining the British Indian Army: first, a youthful desire for adventure and, second, an interest in the politics of the time. Attached to the 49th Bengal Regiment, he was posted to the Karachi Cantonment, where he wrote his first prose and poetry. Although he never saw active fighting, he rose in rank from corporal to havildar (sergeant) and served as quartermaster for his battalion.

During this period, Nazrul Islam read extensively the works of Rabindranath Tagore and Sarat Chandra Chattopadhyay, as well as the Persian poets Hafez, Omar Khayyam, and Rumi. He learnt Persian poetry from the regiment's Punjabi Moulvi, practiced music, and pursued his literary interests. His first prose work, "Life of a Vagabond" ('Baunduler Atmakahini), was published in May 1919. His poem "Mukti" ("মুক্তি", 'Freedom') was published by the Bengali Muslim Literary Journal (Bangiya Mussalman Sahitya Samiti) in July 1919.

== Career ==
Bidrohi (The Rebel)

I am the unutterable grief,
I am the trembling first touch of the virgin,
I am the throbbing tenderness of her first stolen kiss.
I am the fleeting glance of the veiled beloved,
I am her constant surreptitious gaze...

I am the burning volcano in the bosom of the earth,
I am the wildfire of the woods,
I am Hell's mad terrific sea of wrath!
I ride on the wings of lightning with joy and profundity,
I scatter misery and fear all around,
I bring earthquakes on this world! "(8th stanza)"

I am the rebel eternal,
I raise my head beyond this world,
High, ever erect and alone!

— Translation by Kabir Choudhary

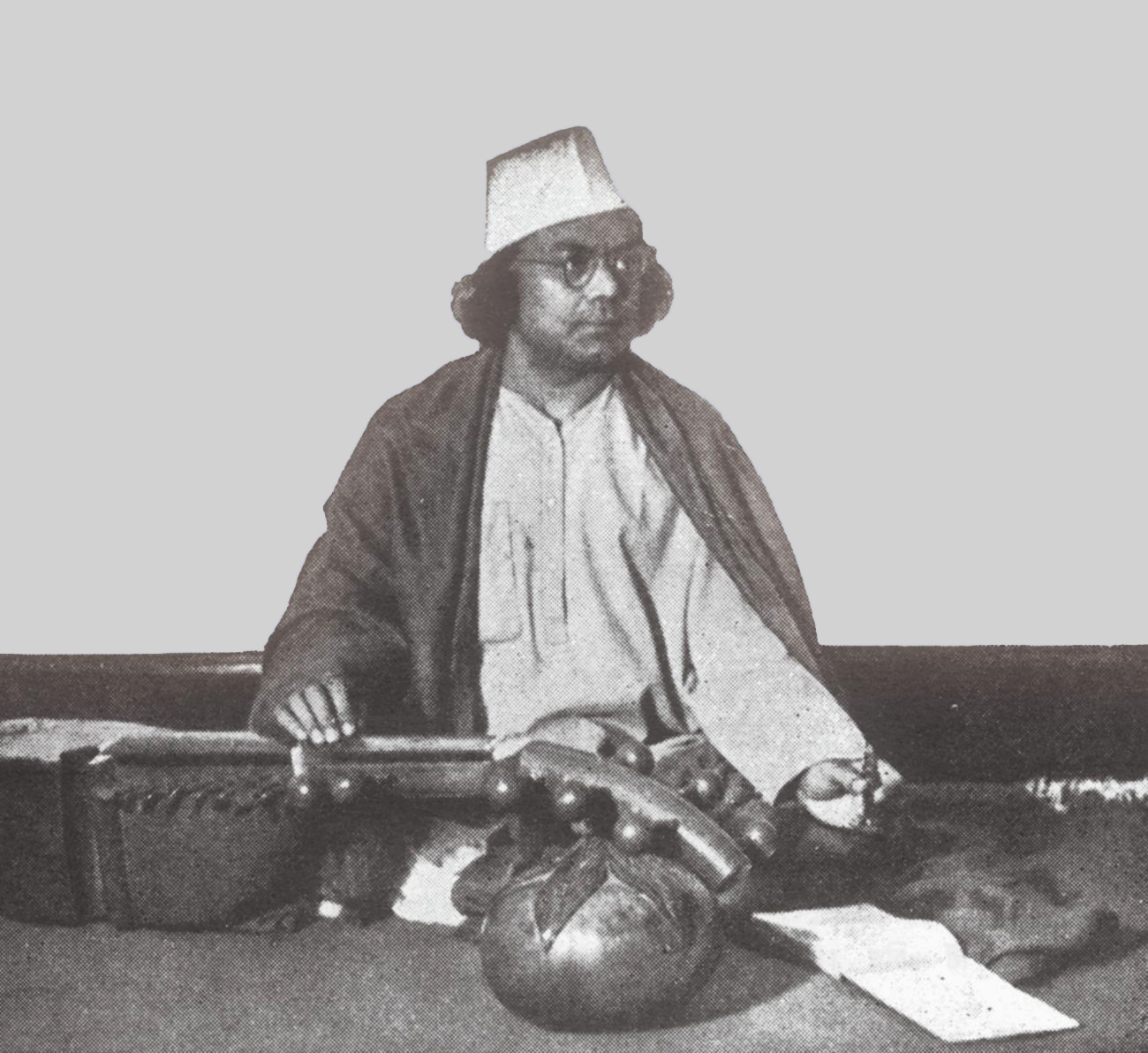
Kazi Nazrul Islam playing Sarod

Kazi Nazrul Islam joined the army in late 1917. Nazrul Islam left the British Indian army in 1920, when the 49th Bengal Regiment was disbanded, and settled in Calcutta. He joined the staff of the Bangiya Mussalman Sahitya Samiti ("Bengali Muslim Literary Society"). He published his first novel Bandhan-hara (বাঁধন-হারা, 'Freedom from Bondage') in 1920, on which he continued to work over the next seven years. His first collection of poems, which included "Bodhan", "Shat-il-Arab", "Kheya-parer Tarani", and "Badal Prater Sharab", received critical acclaim.

Nazrul Islam grew close to other young Muslim writers, while working at the Bengali Muslim Literary Society, including Mohammad Mozammel Haq, Kazi Abdul Wadud, and Muhammad Shahidullah. Nazrul Islam and Muhammad Shahidullah remained close throughout their lives. He was a regular at the social clubs for Calcutta's writers, poets, and intellectuals such as the Gajendar Adda and the Bharatiya Adda. Nazrul did not have the formal education of Rabindranath and as a result his poems did not follow the literary practices established by Rabindranath. Due to this he faced criticism from followers of Rabindranath. Despite their differences, Nazrul looked to Rabindranath Tagore as a mentor. In 1921, Nazrul Islam was engaged to Nargis, the niece of a well-known Muslim publisher, Ali Akbar Khan, in Daulatpur, Comilla. On 18 June 1921, the day of the wedding, upon public insistence by Khan that the term "Nazrul must reside in Daulatpur after marriage" be included in the marriage contract, Nazrul Islam walked away from the wedding ceremony.

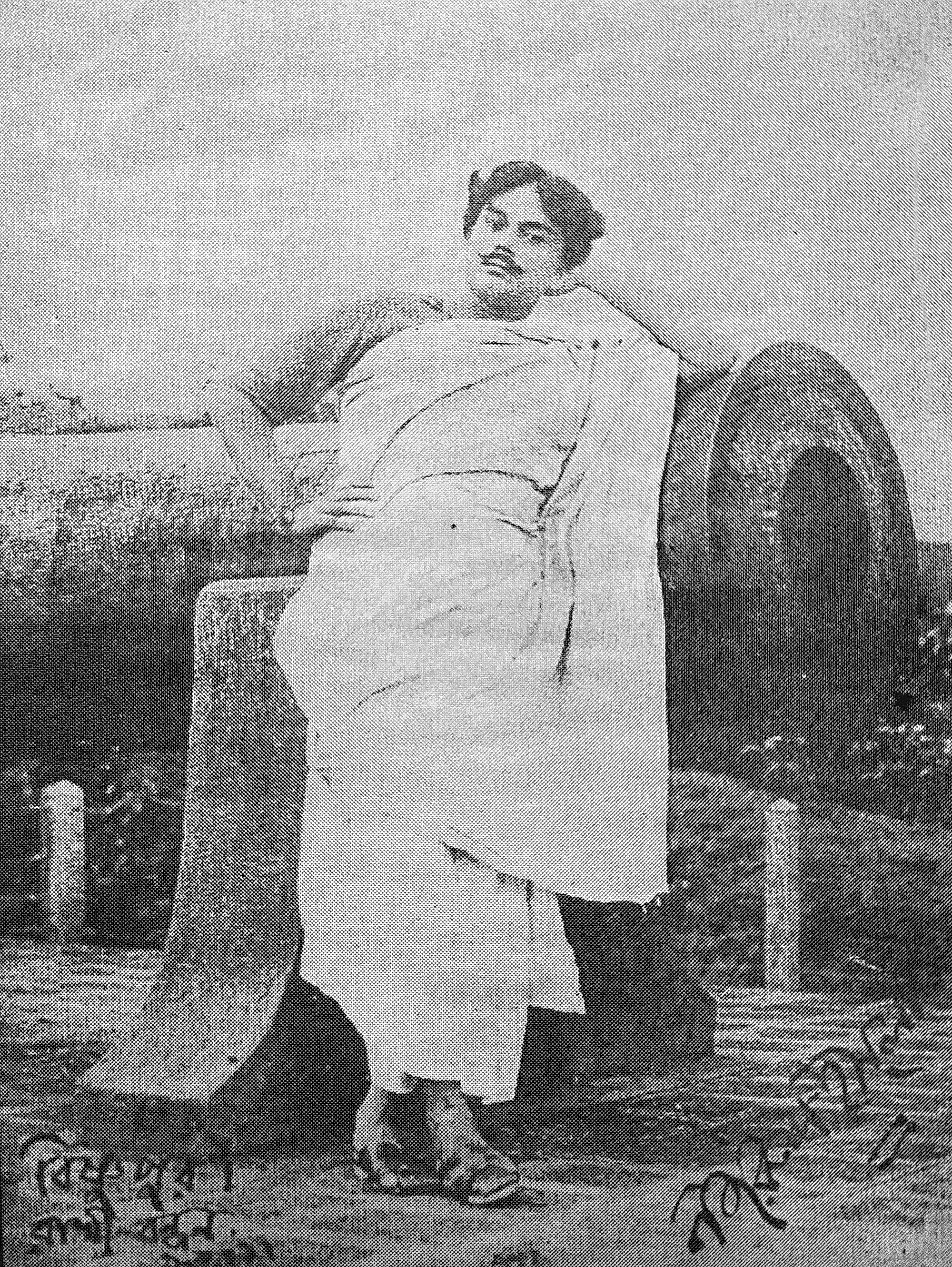
Young Kazi Nazrul Islam in-front of Dalmadal Cannon in Bishnupur, Bankura, 1920s

Nazrul Islam reached the peak of his fame in 1922 with Bidrohi (The Rebel), which remains his most famous work, winning the admiration of India's literary society for his description of a rebel. Published in the Bijli (বিজলী, "Lightning") magazine, the rebellious language and theme were well received, coinciding with the Non-Cooperation Movement – the first mass nationalist campaign of civil disobedience against British rule. Nazrul Islam explores the different forces at work in a rebel, the destroyer, and the preserver who is able to express rage as well as beauty and sensitivity. He followed up by writing Pralayollas ('Destructive Euphoria'), and his first anthology of poems, the Agni-veena ("অগ্নি-বীণা", 'Lyre of Fire') in 1922, which enjoyed commercial and critical success. He also published a volume of short stories, the Byathar Dan "ব্যথার দান" ('Gift of Sorrow'), and Yugbani ("যুগবাণী"), an anthology of essays.

Nazrul Islam started a bi-weekly magazine, Dhumketu ("ধূমকেতু", 'Comet') on 12 August 1922 that was critical of the British Empire. Earning the moniker of the "rebel poet", Nazrul Islam aroused the suspicion of British Raj authorities. The police raided the office of Dhumketu after it published "Anondomoyeer Agomone" ("আনন্দময়ীর আগমনে"), a political poem, in September 1922. Nazrul Islam was arrested on 23 January 1923 and charged with sedition. He presented a long argument in the court, an excerpt of what he said:

I have been accused of sedition... To plead for me, the king of all kings, the judge of all judges, the eternal truth the living God... I am a poet; I have been sent by God to express the unexpressed, to portray the unportrayed. It is God who is heard through the voice of the poet... I am an instrument of God. The instrument is not unbreakable, but who is there to break God?

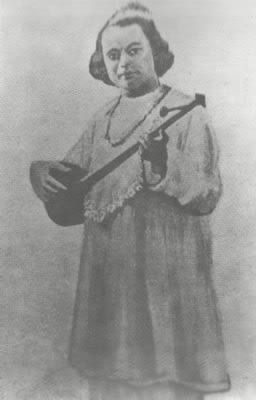
Kazi Nazrul Islam in the role of Narada, in the stage drama Dhruba.

On 14 April 1923, he was moved from Alipore Jail to Hooghly Jail in Hooghly. He began a 40-day fast to protest mistreatment by the British jail superintendent, breaking his fast more than a month later and eventually being released from prison in December 1923. Nazrul Islam composed numerous poems and songs during his period of imprisonment. In the 1920s, the British Indian government banned many of his writings. Rabindranath Tagore dedicated his play "Basanta" to Nazrul Islam in 1923. Nazrul Islam wrote the poem "Aj Srishti Shukher Ullashe" to thank Tagore. His book Bisher Banshi ('The Flute of Poison'), published in August 1924, was banned by the British Raj. Bisher Banshi called for rebellion in India against the British Raj. Bisher Banshi was read and distributed in secret following the ban.

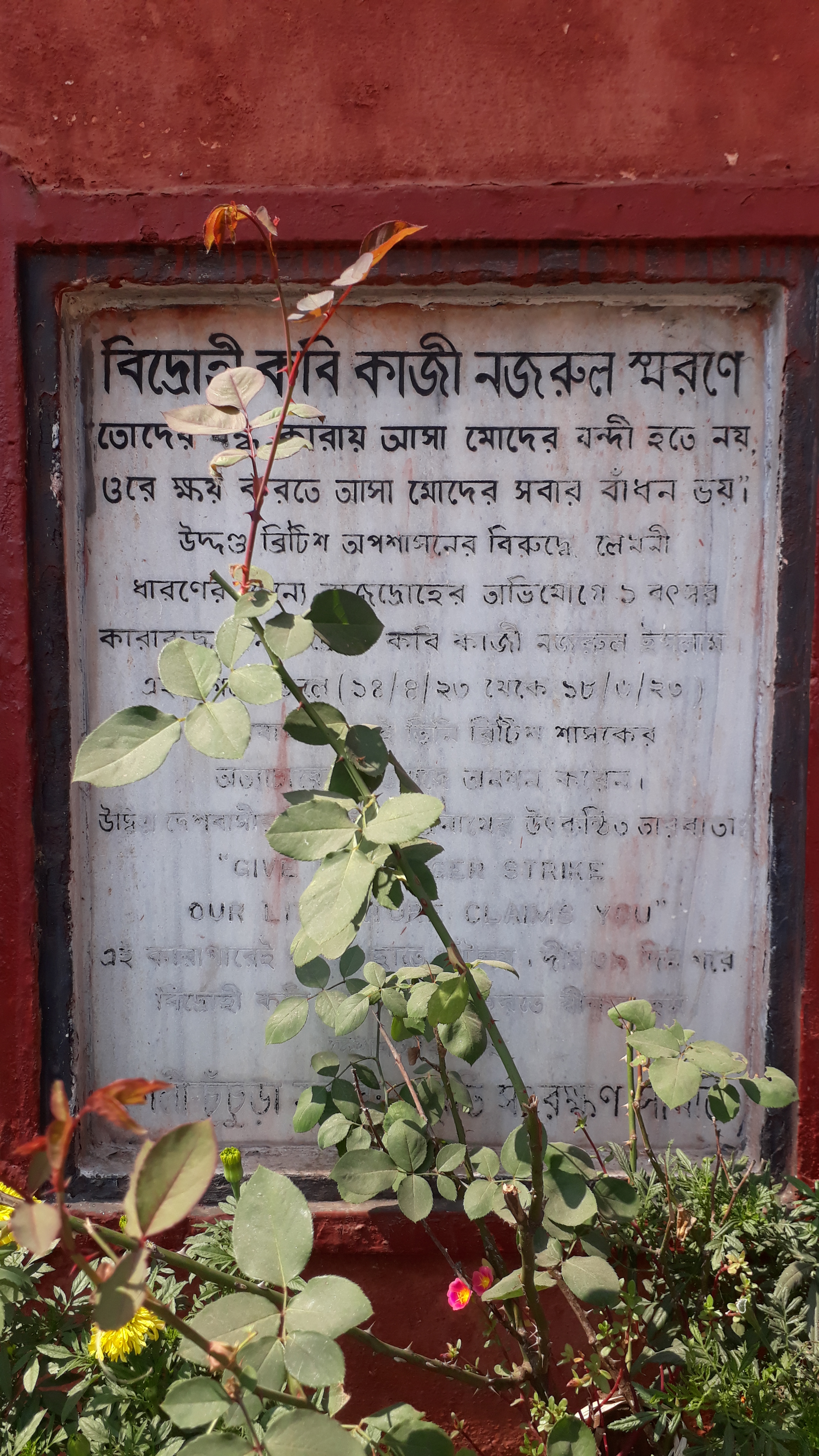
Plaque in memory of Kazi Nazrul Islam in Hooghly Jail

Nazrul Islam was a critic of the Khilafat Movement in British India which he condemned as "hollow religious fundamentalism". His rebellious expression extended to rigid orthodoxy in the name of religion and politics. He also criticised the Indian National Congress for not embracing outright political independence from the British Empire. Nazrul became active in encouraging people to agitate against British rule, and joined the Bengal state unit of the Indian National Congress. Along with Muzaffar Ahmed, Nazrul also helped organise the Sramik Praja Swaraj Dal (Workers and Peasants Party), a socialist political party committed to national independence and the service of the working class. On 16 December 1925, Nazrul began publishing the Langal ('Plough'), a weekly, and served as its chief editor.

During his visit to Comilla in 1921, Nazrul Islam met a young Bengali Hindu woman, Pramila Devi, with whom he fell in love, and they married on 25 April 1924. Brahmo Samaj criticised Pramila, a member of the Brahmo Samaj, for marrying a Muslim. Muslim religious leaders criticised Nazrul Islam for his marriage to a Hindu woman. He also was criticised for his writings. Despite controversy, Nazrul Islam's popularity and reputation as the "rebel poet" increased significantly.

With his wife and young son Bulbul, Nazrul Islam settled at Grace Cottage, Krishnanagar in Krishnanagar in 1926. His work began to transform as he wrote poetry and songs that articulated the aspirations of the working class, a sphere of his work known as "mass music".

Daridro (Poverty)

O poverty, thou hast made me great
Thou hast made me honoured like Christ
With his crown of thorns. Thou hast given me
Courage to reveal all. To thee I owe
My insolent, naked eyes and sharp tongue.
Thy curse has turned my violin to a sword...
O proud saint, thy terrible fire
Has rendered my heaven barren.
O my child, my darling one
I could not give thee even a drop of milk
No right have I to rejoice.
Poverty weeps within my doors forever
As my spouse and my child.
Who will play the flute?

— Translated by Kabir Chowdhury

In what his contemporaries regarded as one of his greatest flairs of creativity, Nazrul Islam vastly contributed in profusely enriching ghazals in Bengali, transforming a form of poetry written mainly in Persian and Urdu. Nazrul Islam's recording of Islamic songs was a commercial success and created interest in gramophone companies about publishing his works. A significant impact of Nazrul Islam's work in Bengal was that it made Bengali Muslims more comfortable with the Bengali arts, which used to be dominated by Bengali Hindus. His Islamic songs are popular during Ramadan in Bangladesh. He also wrote devotional songs on the Hindu Goddess Kali. Nazrul Islam also composed a number of notable Shyamasangeet, Bhajan and Kirtan, combining Hindu devotional music. In 1928, Nazrul Islam began working as a lyricist, composer, and music director for the Gramophone Company of India. The songs written and music composed by him were broadcast on radio stations across India, including on the Indian Broadcasting Company.

Naari (Woman)

I don't see any difference
Between a man and woman
Whatever great or benevolent achievements
That are in this world
Half of that was by woman,
The other half by man.

— Translation by Sajed Kamal

Nazrul Islam believed in the equality of women, a view his contemporaries considered revolutionary, as expressed in his poem Naari (women). Nazrul Islam's poems strongly emphasised the confluence of the roles of both sexes and their equal importance to life. His poem "Barangana" (Prostitute) stunned society with its depiction of prostitutes who he addresses in the poem as "mother". In the poem, Nazrul Islam accepts the prostitute as a human being first, reasoning that this person belonged to the "race of mothers and sisters"; he criticises society's negative views on prostitutes.

An advocate of women rights, Nazrul Islam portrayed both traditional and nontraditional women in his work. He talked about the working poor through his works such as the poem: 'Poverty' (Daridro).

Nazrul Islam wrote thousands of songs, known collectively as Nazrul Geeti. The exact number is uncertain. The complete text of 2,260 is known, and the first lines of 2,872 have been collected, but according to musicologist Karunamaya Goswami, it is popularly believed that the total is much higher. Goswami has written that some contemporaries put the number near 4,000.

== Religious beliefs ==
Nazrul Islam was born a Muslim, but engaged in religious syncretism so often such that he was seen by laymen as only a proud pluralist. Nazrul Islam wrote an editorial in Joog Bani in 1920 about religious pluralism,

Come brother Hindu! Come Musalman! Come Buddhist! Come Christian! Let us transcend all barriers, let us forsake forever all smallness, all lies, all selfishness and let us call brothers as brothers. We shall quarrel no more.

—

In another article entitled Hindu Mussalman, published in Ganabani on 2 September 1922, he wrote that the religious quarrels were between priests and Imams and not between laymen Muslims and Hindus. As he puts it :-- "I can accept Hinduism and Islam, but I can't stand Tikism (Tiki is a bunch of uncut hair held closely together on the head by some Hindus) and beardism (the practice of growing a beard to show off as a Muslim). Tiki doesn't mean Hinduism… nor does a beard mean Islam [Trans. added]." He also wrote that the Prophets had become property like cattle but they should instead be treated like a light that is for all men.

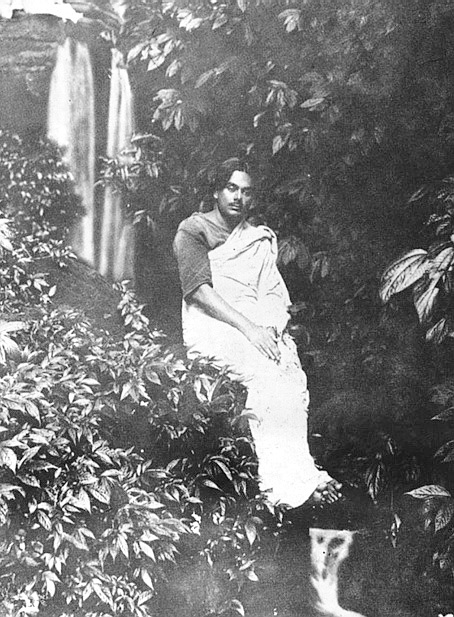
Kazi Nazrul Islam in Sitakunda, Chittagong District in 1929.

Nazrul Islam criticised religious fanaticism, denouncing it as evil and inherently irreligious. He wrote about human equality in his writings. He also explored the philosophy of the Qur'an and Muhammad by writing about them. Nazrul Islam has been compared to William Butler Yeats by Serajul Islam Choudhury, Bengali literary critic and professor emeritus at the University of Dhaka, for being the first Muslim poet to create imagery and symbolism of Muslim historical figures such as Qasim ibn Hasan, Ali, Umar, Kamal Pasha, and Muhammad. His condemnation of extremism and mistreatment of women provoked condemnation from Muslim and Hindu fundamentalists who opposed his liberal views on religion.

Nazrul Islam's mother died in 1928, and his second son, Bulbul, died of smallpox the following year. His first son, Krishna Mohammad, had died prematurely. Pramila gave birth to two more sons – Sabyasachi in 1928 and Aniruddha in 1931 – but Nazrul Islam remained grief-stricken and grieved for a long time. His works changed significantly from the rebellious exploration of society to a deeper examination of religious themes. His works in these years led Islamic devotional songs into the mainstream of Bengali folk music, exploring the Islamic practices of namaz (prayer), roza (fasting), hajj (pilgrimage), and zakat (charity). He wrote the song "O Mon Romzaner Oi Rozar Sheshe" on fasting during Ramadan. This was regarded by his contemporaries as a significant achievement, as Bengali Muslims had been strongly averse to devotional music.

Nazrul Islam was not limited to Islamic devotional music but also wrote Hindu devotional music. He composed Agamanis, Bhajans, Shyama Sangeet, and kirtan. Nazrul Islam wrote over 500 Hindu devotional songs. However, a section of Muslims criticised for writing Shyama Sangeet and declared him Kafir (infidel). On the other hand, Nazrul was displeased that some Hindus objected to his writing devotional songs about Hindu goddesses because he was a Muslim. Nazrul Islam's poetry and songs explored the philosophy of Islam and Hinduism. Nazrul Islam's poetry imbibed the passion and creativity of Shakti, which is identified as the Brahman, the personification of primordial energy. He also composed many songs of invocation to Shiva and the goddesses Lakshmi and Saraswati and on the love of Radha and Krishna. Nazrul Islam was an exponent of humanism. Although a Muslim, he named his sons with both Hindu and Muslim names: Krishna Mohammad, Arindam Khaled (Bulbul), Kazi Sabyasachi and Kazi Aniruddha.

== Later life ==
In 1930, his book Pralayshikha was banned and he faced charges of sedition by the British Indian colonial government. He was sent to jail and released in 1931, after the Gandhi–Irwin Pact was signed. In 1933, Nazrul Islam published a collection of essays titled "Modern World Literature", in which he analyses different styles and themes of literature. Between 1928 and 1935, he published 10 volumes containing 800 songs, of which more than 600 were based on classical ragas. Almost 100 were folk tunes after kirtans, and some 30 were patriotic songs. From the time of his return to Kolkata until he fell ill in 1941, Nazrul Islam composed more than 2,600 songs, many of which have been lost. His songs based on Baul, jhumur, Santhali folksongs, jhanpan, or the folk songs of snake charmers, bhatiali, and bhaoaia consist of tunes of folk-songs on the one hand and a refined lyric with poetic beauty on the other. Nazrul Islam also wrote and published poems for children.

Nazrul Islam's success soon brought him into Indian theatre and the then-nascent film industry. His first film as a director was Dhruba, which made him the first Muslim director of a Bengali film. The film Vidyapati (Master of Knowledge) was produced based on his recorded play in 1936, and Nazrul Islam served as the music director for the film Patalpuri and Gora, (adaptation of Tagore's novel). Nazrul Islam wrote songs and directed music for Sachin Sengupta's biographical epic play based on the life of Siraj-ud-Daula. He worked on the plays "Jahangir" and "Annyapurna" by Monilal Gangopadhyay. In 1939 Nazrul began working for Calcutta Radio, supervising the production and broadcasting of the station's musical programs. He produced critical and analytic documentaries on music, such as "Haramoni" and "Navaraga-malika". Nazrul Islam also wrote a large variety of songs inspired by the raga Bhairav.

== Illness and death ==
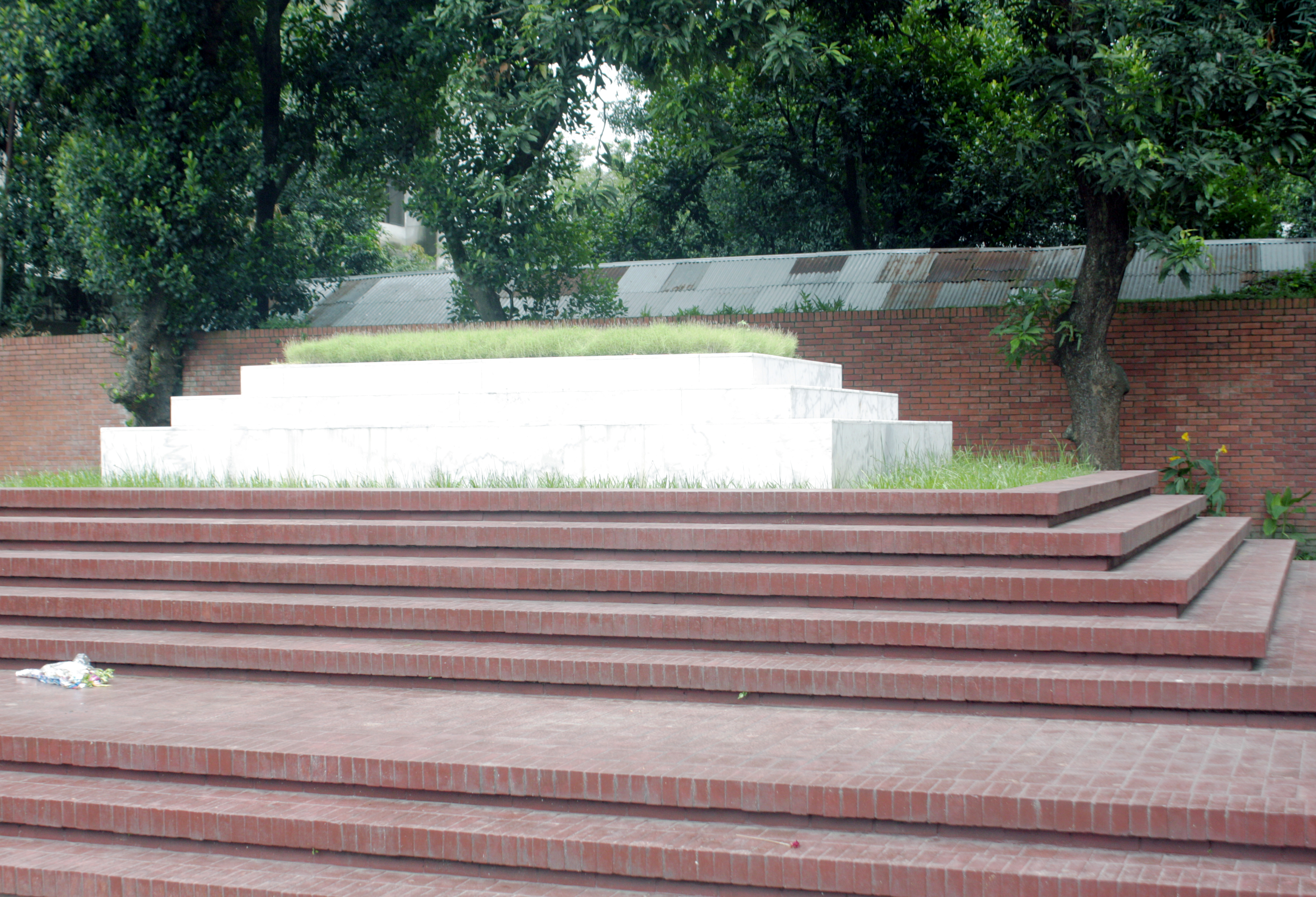
As per a wish expressed in the Nazrul Geeti "Mashjideri Pashe Amar Kobor Dio Bhai" (Bury me next to the mosque, brother), Kazi Nazrul Islam is buried beside the Central Mosque of the Dhaka University

Nazrul Islam's wife Pramila Devi fell seriously ill in 1939 and was paralysed from the waist down. To provide for his wife's medical treatment, he mortgaged the royalties of his gramophone records and literary works for 400 rupees. He returned to journalism in 1940 by working as chief editor for the daily newspaper Nabajug ('New Age'), founded by the Bengali politician A. K. Fazlul Huq.

On hearing about the death of Rabindranath Tagore on 8 August 1941, a shocked Nazrul Islam composed two poems in Tagore's memory. One of the two poems, "Rabihara" (loss of Rabi, or without Rabi), was broadcast on the All India Radio. Within months, Nazrul Islam himself fell ill and gradually began losing his power of speech. His behaviour became erratic, he started spending recklessly and fell into financial difficulties. In spite of her own illness, his wife constantly cared for her husband. However, Nazrul Islam's health had seriously deteriorated and he grew increasingly depressed. He received treatment under homeopathy as well as Ayurveda, but little progress was achieved before mental dysfunction intensified and he was admitted to a mental asylum in 1942. Spending four months there without making progress, Nazrul Islam and his family began living a quiet life in India. In 1952, he was transferred to a psychiatric hospital in Ranchi. Through the efforts of a large group of admirers who called themselves the "Nazrul Treatment Society", Nazrul Islam and Pramila were sent to London, then to Vienna for treatment. The examining doctors said he had received poor care, and Dr. Hans Hoff, a leading neurosurgeon in Vienna, diagnosed that Nazrul Islam had Pick's disease. Dr. Bidhan Chandra Roy, then the Chief Minister of West Bengal, was aware of Nazrul's illness and visited Vienna to meet with Dr. Hoff. Dr. Ashok Bagchi, a neurosurgeon from Kolkata, also played a role in Nazrul's treatment while in Vienna. His condition was judged to be incurable, Nazrul Islam returned to Calcutta on 15 December 1953. On 30 June 1962 Pramila died, and Nazrul Islam remained in intensive medical care. He stopped working due to his deteriorating health.

Despite receiving treatment and attention, Nazrul Islam's physical and mental health did not improve; and Nazrul Islam soon died from his long-standing ailments on 29 August 1976. In accordance with a wish he had expressed in one of his poems, he was buried beside a mosque on the campus of the University of Dhaka.

Controversy has been reported around the funeral of Nazrul Islam. Nazrul Islam's sons requested the Bangladesh High Commission in Delhi to arrange for the return of their father's body to India by an aircraft so that he could be buried beside their mother's grave as per her last wishes. A space had been reserved for his burial next to her grave in the poet's native village, Churulia. When the sons arrived in Dhaka for the last rites, they found that they were completed without their attendance and that the poet had been buried in Dhaka University. Popular demand continues in West Bengal for the poet to be buried back in India.

Bangladesh observed two days of national mourning, and the Parliament of India observed a minute of silence in his honour.

== Criticism ==
According to literary critic Serajul Islam Choudhury, Nazrul Islam's poetry is characterised by abundant use of rhetorical devices, which he employed to convey conviction and sensuousness. He often wrote without care for organisation or polish. His works have often been criticised for egotism, but his admirers counter that they carry more a sense of self-confidence than of ego. They cite his ability to defy God, or rather orthodox conceptions of God, yet maintain an inner, humble devotion to Him. Nazrul Islam's poetry is regarded as rugged but unique in comparison to Tagore's sophisticated style. Nazrul Islam's use of Persian vocabulary was controversial, but it increased the range of his work.

== Legacy ==
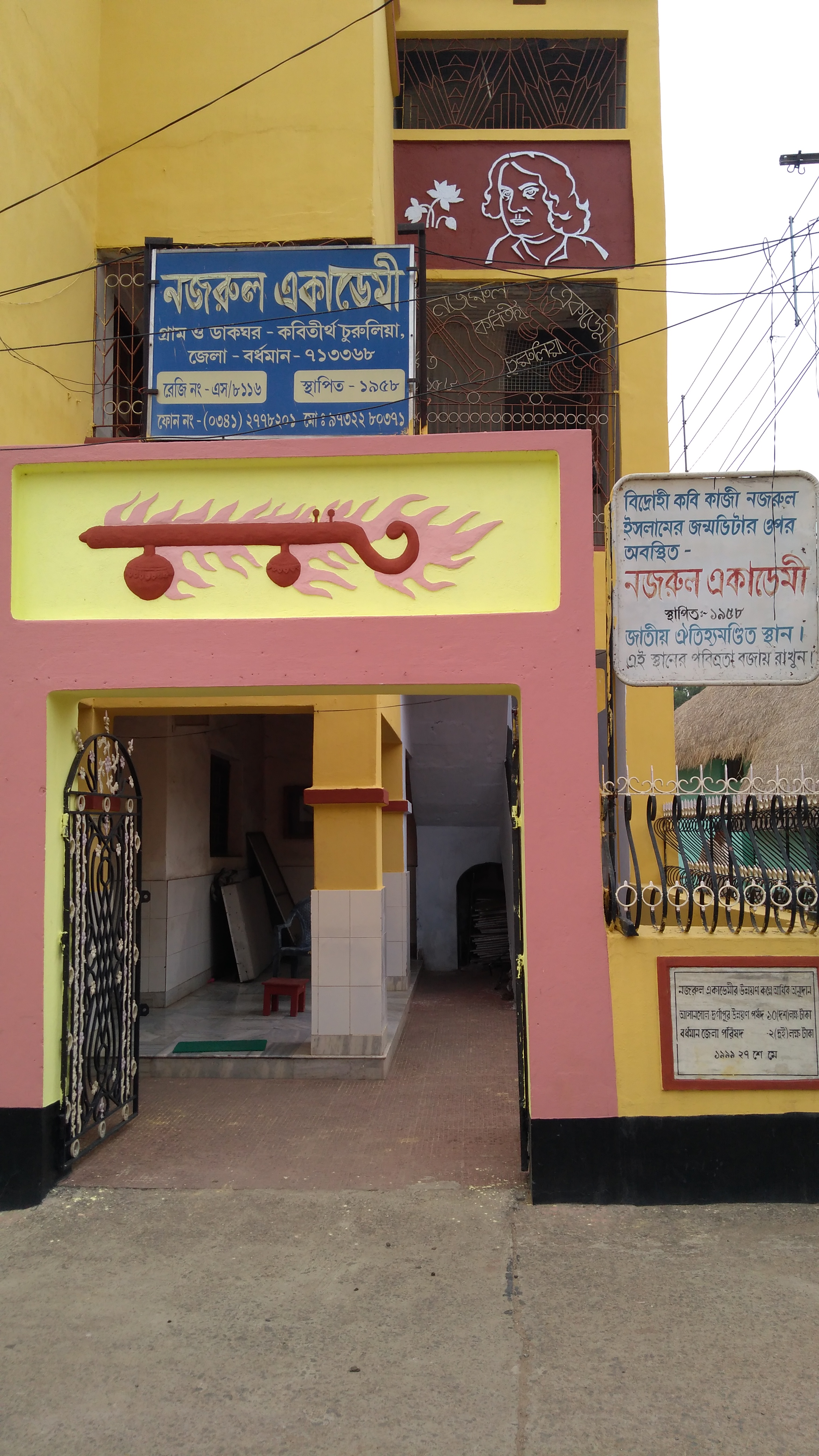
Nazrul Academy in Churulia, Asansol, West Bengal, India which is also the birthplace of Kazi Nazrul Islam.

On 24 May 1972, the newly independent nation of Bangladesh brought Nazrul Islam to live in Dhaka with the consent of the Government of India. The government of Bangladesh conferred upon him the status of national poet in 1972. However it was officially gazetted in 2024. In February 1976, during his stay in Bangladesh, he was awarded Bangladeshi citizenship.

He was awarded an Honorary D.Litt. by the University of Dhaka in 1974 and in 1976. He was awarded the Ekushey Padak by the President of Bangladesh Justice Abu Sadat Mohammad Sayem. Many centres of learning and culture in Bangladesh and India had been founded and dedicated to his memory. The Bangladesh Nazrul Sena is a large public organisation working for the education of children throughout the country. The Nazrul Endowment provides funding for research into the life and work of Kazi Nazrul Islam in U.S. Universities like California State University, Northridge and Connecticut State University. Nazrul was awarded the Jagattarini Gold Medal, the highest honour for work in Bengali literature by the University of Calcutta, in 1945 and was awarded the Padma Bhushan, the third-highest civilian award of India, in 1960.

Nazrul Islam's works for children have won acclaim for his use of rich language, imagination, enthusiasm, and an ability to fascinate young readers. Nazrul is regarded for his secularism. His poetry has been translated to several languages including English, Spanish, and Portuguese. The Uzbek poet Erkin Vohidov wrote an epic poem about Nazrul Islam entitled Ruhlar isyoni (The Rise of the Spirits). A major avenue is named after him in Dhaka, Bangladesh. There is a cultural institution called Nazrul Academy, which is spread throughout Bangladesh. A chair has been named after him in University of Calcutta and the Government of West Bengal has opened a Nazrul Tirtha in Rajarhat, a cultural centre with library, auditorium and movie theatre dedicated to his memory. On 25 May 2020, Google celebrated his 121st birthday with a Google Doodle.

== Family tree ==
- Kazi Faqeer Ahmed, m. Zahida Khatun
  - Kazi Saahibjaan
  - Kazi Ali Hussain
  - Umme Kulsum
  - Kazi Nazrul Islam, m. Pramila Devi (d. 1962)
    - Krishna Mohammad
    - Arindam Khaled Bulbul
    - Kazi Sabyasachi (1928–1979), m. Uma Kazi (d. 2020)
      - Khilkhil Kazi
      - Mistee Kazi
      - Babul Kazi (d. 2025)
    - Kazi Aniruddha (d. 1974), m. Kalyani Kazi (d. 2023)
      - Kazi Anirban (d. 2024)
      - Kazi Arindam
      - Anindita Kazi

== See also ==
- List of works of Kazi Nazrul Islam
