= Sunny Sanwar =

Bangladeshi-born American artist, environmental activist and entrepreneur

- সানি সানওয়ার
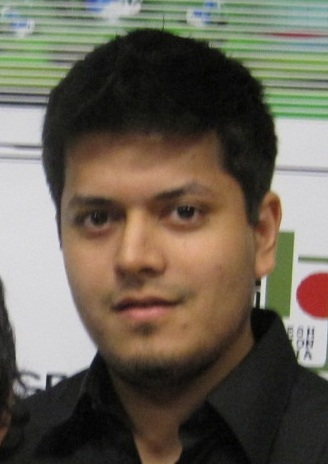
- Born: Sahibzada Sanwar Azam Sunny; 17 December 1989 (age 36); Dhaka, Bangladesh
- Education: BS University of Kansas School of Engineering; MPA UMKC Henry W. Bloch School of Management (2013); PhD UMKC Henry W. Bloch School of Management (2018)
- Parent(s): Sahibzada Sarwar Azam; Begum Kamrun Nahar
- Family: House of Singra and Natore; Munshibari family of Comilla

Sahibzada Sanwar Azam Sunny (/ˈsænˈwɔːr ˈəsəm səniː/; Bengali: সানওয়ার আজম সানি, born 17 December 1989) is a Bangladeshi-born American artist, environmental activist, inventor and entrepreneur. He became fluent in multiple languages and is one of the youngest artists to have a solo exhibition at the National Art Gallery with work in permanent collection at the Liberation War Museum. He finished four years of American high school in eight months with honours and was a college senior by the age of eighteen, teaching university courses in engineering at the age of 21.

== Early life and family ==
His father was a senior member of the Singranatore family and a military commander of the national Army, United Nations forces and the Border Guard, while his mother, Kamrun Nahar of the Munshibari family of Comilla was an artist and scientist, a student of Iajuddin Ahmed, the thirteenth president of Bangladesh. Both parents were born in erstwhile East Pakistan. He grew up in various places around the country. He has an older sister, named Shahzia Sarwar, an architect.

The House of Singra and Natore (Singranatore Zamindari) was a formerly ruling family who were hereditary lords (Zamindars) in the northwestern region of Rajshahi in erstwhile East Bengal in the area of present-day Singra, Bangladesh. In 1950, the State Acquisition Act was adopted by the erstwhile democratic government of East Pakistan, abolishing the rights of the feudal ruling families. The Singranatore family, who served as vassals to the Maharajas of Natore and Dighapatia, also produced many influential members and politicians.

=== Background and education ===
In 2005, as a youth ambassador to the United States, he was supported by the Bureau of Educational and Cultural Affairs of the United States Department of State. He started high school at Lincoln College Preparatory Academy after completing eighth grade, to study International Baccalaureate and was a senior aged fifteen. His first ever paid job at the age of 16 was to do a MATLAB programming project for Miftahur Rahman at the Department of Electrical Engineering and Computer Science at North South University.

A child prodigy, he could fluently read, write or speak six languages by the age of eight and by 2006 he completed the four-year American high school program in less than nine months, as a member of the Honor Roll, United States National Honor Society and winning awards with the Science Olympiad. Then he was offered a merit scholarship by the University of Kansas School of Engineering when he was only sixteen years old. He was a final year university student (college senior) studying engineering by the age of eighteen. At Kansas, he was an active brother of the Pi Kappa Alpha fraternity (PIKE) initiated through the Beta Gamma chapter.

He also holds a Master of Public Administration degree (2013) and a PhD in entrepreneurship and innovation (2018) from the Henry W. Bloch School of Management at the University of Missouri-Kansas City. He was a graduate researcher under Jered Carr at the L.P. Cookingham Institute of Urban Affairs where Nicholas Peroff was his graduate advisor. He graduated with Pi Alpha Alpha, Omicron Delta Kappa and Phi Kappa Phi honours.

== Activities ==
His family was involved in the energy and infrastructure sectors for decades, particularly oil. His paternal uncle M. M. Rahmat Ullah, an East Pakistani bureaucrat from the 1960s and politician who unsuccessfully contested the seat of Natore's third constituency as a member of parliament to the National Assembly in the Eighth National Parliamentary Elections of 2001, was also the chief engineer of the Public Works Department and later the chairman of the Capital Development Authority of the government of Bangladesh under General Hussain Muhammad Ershad, the military dictator and later president of Bangladesh. The President and he were however charged in the Janata Tower Case in the early 1990s by the Supreme Court of Bangladesh. Another paternal uncle, Akther Hussain of Natore, an East Pakistan regional officer of Pakistan State Oil was made one of the six executives of the Jamuna Oil Company, Bangladesh's National oil company under Bangladesh Petroleum Corporation by the government of Bangladesh.

A maternal uncle, Major Raihanul Abedin was the PSC director of the Bangladesh Oil, Gas and Mineral Corporation. Working on behalf of the government of Bangladesh, he oversaw all energy production treaties with various foreign energy companies, including Enron Corporation, Niko Resources, and Tullow Oil. Later, during the military-supported government of Bangladesh in 2007 he was appointed the managing director of Water Supply and Sewerage System. He was forced to resign on charges of nepotism once the ruling party took power in the 2009 national elections when the newly formed government sued top officials of the old regime. The Major was credited with being the first to introduce cooking gas instead of harmful fuels for automotive fuel, to decrease carbon emission in early 2001 under Prime Minister Khaleda Zia.

=== Clean transportation ===
In 2008, he cofounded the KU Ecohawks during the Automotive industry crisis of 2008–2010 in the United States. The group recycles old vehicles to run on community wastes and renewables, especially on the University of Kansas campus (and adjoining localities) and not rely on conventional fossil fuel sources that pollute the local and global environment. The Ecohawks was one of the largest and most promising initiatives of the University of Kansas and was funded and sponsored by Aptera Motors, The Coca-Cola Company, Daimler Trucks North America, Grundfos, Yokohama Rubber Company and Black & Veatch among others, at various stages. A college senior at age eighteen, he also worked to computationally quantify and minimise vehicle rolling friction and aerodynamic drag. They built a solar energy filling station on campus consisting of six 180W panels that allowed recharging the car batteries in half a day while it is parked. Cars typically reached 40 mph around campus while the fuel economy was increased to 80 mpge due to solar refilling. Although the recycled car ran, initially media reports called the car to get 500 mpg, which it did not. The ecohawks also proposed a plan to take the vehicles completely off grid. They installed six monocrystalline solar cells on their workspace and charged the cars from it, with no energy taken from the grid.

Their efficiency over performance initiatives, coincided with the Automotive crisis where in 2009, in an exhibition opening, he told the University Daily Kansan that the point of the initiative is trying to get people to think about how 'inefficient' the auto industry is. Later, Ford Motor Company President and CEO Alan Mulally visited the School of Engineering and talked with the students regarding the auto industry and answered questions about the technological, financial, cultural and political realities facing Ford after being bailed out by the US Congress alongside others of the "Big Three". The Ecohawks planned to recycle older cars to run on greener technologies thereby eliminating the energy needed for production; the recycle of the vehicle itself prevented the release of a few tons of carbon to the atmosphere. The team researched advanced technologies in the small scale including NiMH, LiCoO_{2}, LiFePO_{4} batteries. The group used scaled down RC Cars for testing and validation. Research also conceptualised a parallel hybrid design that used a small internal combustion engine running on the a planned biodiesel blend and a brushless electric motor allowing for the doubling of torque. Research with ECM, hydrogen fuel cells and Metal hydride storage tanks, funded by the United States Environmental Protection Agency (US EPA) grant that led to the group design an infrastructure with Smart grid technologies to be showcased in Washington, DC and converted more vehicle. The groups designs were adopted by the university when the KU Libraries started using vehicles that were converted by the ecohawks. The KU Libraries mail vehicle travelled about 22 miles on average on a given day. The electric vehicle travels 80 to 90 miles before a recharge. The library car was a Chevrolet K5 Blazer, while the neighbourhood EV was a 1974 Volkswagen Beetle.

In February 2011, city officials of Douglas County in Lawrence, KS, declared that the university would be getting an electric car charging station, although the group made the first unofficial charging station in May 2010. In an article by Wired magazine it was estimated that profits, both financial and societal was possible if the ecohawks project was replicated on a larger scale.

=== Green buildings ===
Sunny founded the Sustainable Built Environment Initiative – Bangladesh (later Bangladesh Green Building Council) and since 2008 been bringing together national architects, scientists, environmentalists and government officials to transform the building industry in Bangladesh into a more sustainable and efficient system. With growing population in a diminishing land and rapid urbanisation to major cities, 'Going green' had become a marketing ploy for various organisations as there were no quantifiable way to judge a structures sustainability. He offered a centralised board to offer Leadership in Energy and Environmental Design (LEED) certifications to interested projects and firms and then to propose a similar voluntary building rating tool that is much cheaper to attain and one that is much suited to the socio-economic conditions of the country and relevant to its building environment and construction culture. About the feasibility of widespread utilisation of LEED certifications, it was further said that it is very expensive and the Bangladesh is in the process of developing a green building rating system in the regional context. He elaborated:

I wanted to make a more country-specific rating system. It needed to be more specific to the climate and environment in the country and would help the country's own economy...certain window angles on houses would help heat homes in the U.S., but that would be wasteful in places where they don't need the sun's energy to heat homes.

In 2015, he opined that the garments industry has been a critical early-adopter of green buildings, with certifications playing a critical role:

...tragic events in building collapses in this area, has channeled global attention to this even further. This has affected trade and investor relations greatly, and certification is one way to assuage the concerns.

Educational programs in sustainable designs and various universities in Bangladesh started to promote Green Building principles in their curriculum, such as in the Bangladesh University of Engineering and Technology, American International University-Bangladesh, North South University, BRAC University and Asia Pacific University. Due to conserving water and energy, the rating tool would achieve the six-point goals of the National Water Policy of 1999 by the World Bank as well as the Renewable Energy Policy of 2008 by the Ministry of Power and Energy. National and international energy companies like Energypac and Siemens attended the event to assess the roles of the corporate stakeholders while United Nations Framework Convention on Climate Change (UNFCCC) and Intergovernmental Panel on Climate Change (IPCC) fellows commented on the global imperative of such an initiative. The first proposed rating tool aimed to fulfill the Seventh Target from the United Nations' Millennium Development Goals (MDGs). Initially with minimal government support, the plan was to transform the market with cost effective steps. In another interview with The Independent, it was pointed out that the cost effectiveness of the green buildings are not correctly understood, and that increased productivity and energy savings of a green building outweighs initial costs. In the Dhaka Tribune, he reiterated that "the problem is that there is a great misconception regarding the cost effectiveness of the green design and construction" and that the energy savings far outweigh the initial costs when green building projects are correctly done. In an interview with Southeast Asia Building magazine, he said:

Instead of going for innovative technologies...they [real estate companies] bypass these measures as these would be added costs and extra space, space that they could rather sell in this high demand market.

These activities were also promoted by national and region experts, such as Mustapha Khalid Palash, the 2010 Holcim Green Built Sustainable Design Competition winner was the Chairman of the Practicing Professionals Committee, and Rafiq Azam, defined BGBC platform as a way for Bangladesh to define 'Green' according to the national circumstances. The Institute of Architects Bangladesh, which works with different government organisation to offer education and government advocacy commented on the adaptability of sustainable principles in the national architecture community in the form of the BGBC rating tool. At the same meeting, the Additional Chief Architect of the Ministry of Housing and Public Works, Bangladesh spoke about the government's role. BGBC also briefly collaborated with Washington D.C.–based Development Alternatives Inc to work with World Bank to conduct the first ever national study to identify the scope for developing Green Building Codes and to benchmark the GHG emission standards on Green Buildings and Climate Change in Bangladesh.

In 2012, he was a Brower Youth Award semi-finalist. In 2013, he won the SBN Youth Award (Australia) by patrons Peter Ellyard and Jane Goodall.

=== Sustainable infrastructure ===
To provide jobs for fresh graduates and help the dwindling power sector of the country reduce systematic power outage, he proposed that Bangladesh integrate RETs into the national electric grid to supplement any generation and to maintain a storage system, so that the country may move towards a more stable supply of electricity to the masses and 'attempt' reach the global Millennium Development Goals of the United Nations, specifically on Environmental sustainability as well as Bangladesh's National Renewable Energy Policy's goal of meeting 5% of the national demand with renewable energy sources by 2015 and 10% by 2020. With lack of implementation, he said it would be nearly impossible on the current time frame. Private power could be integrated to the grid and demand response capabilities would mean that Feed-in tariff would be possible for parties who generate power on site and even for energy-efficient home owners. This would expedite investments in sustainable sources of energy. He commented:

Radio transmitters operating remotely in unlicensed radio bands using two way real time communication to transmit coded instructions from the central to the circuit breakers in selected coordinates of the micro grids substations to maintain multiple power flow lines with automated control and digital metering.

He urged to lower the system losses and rectify illegal links, and provide more jobs to the large Electrical and Telecommunications Engineering graduate base in Dhaka while transmitters and meters themselves could be made by local populace. During that time, aged only 21, he taught college courses in the fields of electrical engineering and computer science at North South University. Speaking to representatives from Siemens about smart grid and meter utilisations in Bangladesh, he also involved national renewable energy technology providers and private power generation companies in the upgrade and integration plans.

Although think tanks such as Bangladesh Solar Energy Society and Renewable Energy Institute (REI), along with the German Federal Government International Development Government Agency Deutsche Gesellschaft für Internationale Zusammenarbeit (GIZ) supported his scheme, the Secretary of the Ministry of Power, Government of Bangladesh has said that the government has no plans to upgrade to a smart grid.

== Works ==
Sanwar A. Sunny
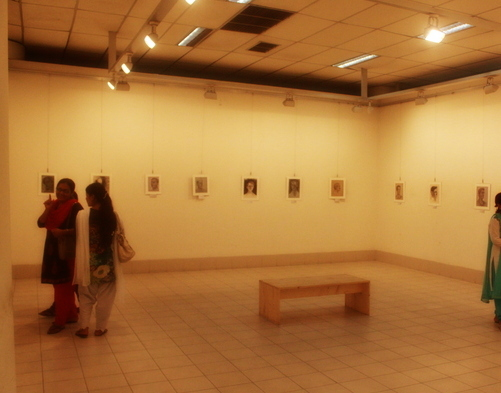
- Display at Shilpakala Gallery exhibition

He eventually became one of the youngest artists to have a solo exhibition at the National Art Gallery with work in permanent collection at the Liberation War Museum.

== See also ==
- List of child prodigies
