= KU Ecohawks =

Organization promoting sustainability in the automotive sector

The Ecohawks
- Founded: 2008
- Founder: Chris Depcik, Matt LeGresley, Lou McKown, Charles Sprouse III, Sunny Sanwar, Ryan Lierz
- Purpose: Sustainability
- Location: Lawrence, Kansas, United States
- Region served: Douglas County, Kansas
- Website: http://www.ecohawks.org/

The University of Kansas Sustainable Automotive Energy Infrastructure Initiative, or more commonly referred to as the KU Ecohawks (short for Ecofriendly Jayhawks) is an ongoing project that works to promote sustainability in the automotive sector. Founded during the beginning of the Automotive industry crisis of 2008–2010 in the U.S., the group recycles old vehicles to run on community wastes and renewables, especially on the University of Kansas campus (and adjoining localities) and not rely on conventional fossil fuel sources that pollute the local and global environment.

== Background ==
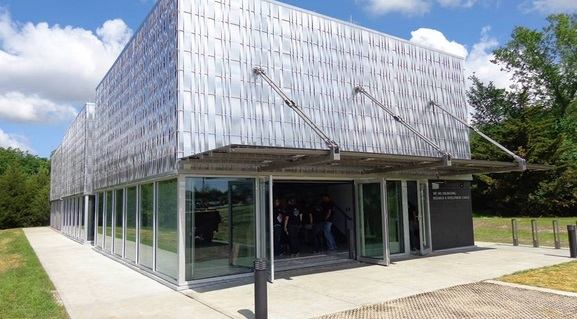
The Ecohawks Building in Lawrence, KS

In February 2008, University of Michigan-Ann Arbor Assistant Professor Christopher Depcik and a group of 5 engineering students from the University of Kansas met to organize a new project recognized by the School of Engineering that builds efficient community cars that run primarily on renewable energy sources. By August, the team added 6 more members to start the Fall Semester. Depcik worked with both General Motors Company and Ford Motor Company in Detroit. They picked an old non functioning car from a dump, which was meant to be destroyed and sold in scraps and recycled it into a series hybrid that ran on biodiesel made from used cooking oil from the campus dormitories. Later this was presented to a board saying that the car would get 500 MPG, which generated great media attention. It was a media stunt, and the car ended up getting 54 MPG. Moreover, the recycle of the vehicle itself prevented the release of a few tons of carbon to the atmosphere. They ran the car on different feedstock like ethanol, biodiesel and electricity and stressed efficiency over performance, as noted by co-founder Louis McKown in 2008. In 2009, another co-founder, Sunny Sanwar in an exhibition said that the point of the initiative is trying to get people to think about how 'inefficient' the auto industry is. In May 2009, Ford Motor Company President and CEO Alan Mulally visited the School of Engineering and talked with the students regarding the auto industry and answered questions about the technological, financial, cultural and political realities facing Ford.

The Ecohawks group is one of the largest initiative of the University of Kansas. It was funded and sponsored by Aptera Motors, The Coca-Cola Company, Daimler Trucks North America, Grundfos, Yokohama Rubber Company and Black & Veatch among others, at various stages.

Design and Hybrid Architecture

The team then constructed a plug-in series hybrid electric vehicle. The batteries on board were refilled using a biodiesel generator; conversely, it could be plugged into any typical wall socket found in homes. The team also built a solar energy filling station on campus consisting of six 180-watt panels that allowed recharging the car batteries in half a day while it is parked. Cars typically reached 40 mph around campus while the fuel economy was increased to 80 mpge due to solar refilling. The team uses combinations of different fuel sources each year.

On a much smaller scale the Ecohawks group researched advanced technologies in the small scale including NiMH, LiCoO_{2}, LiFePO_{4} batteries. The utilized scaled down RC Cars for testing and validation. Research also conceptualized a parallel hybrid design that utilized a small internal combustion engine running on the a planned biodiesel blend and a brushless electric motor allowing for the doubling of torque. Research with ECM, hydrogen fuel cells and Metal hydride storage tanks led to the United States Environmental Protection Agency (US EPA) grant that wanted to see the group design an infrastructure with Smart grid technologies. The initiatives were supported by National Instruments

== Community programs ==
The groups designs were adopted by the university when the KU Libraries started using vehicles that were converted by the ecohawks. The KU Libraries mail vehicle traveled about 22 miles on average on a given day. The electric vehicle would travels 80 to 90 miles before a recharge. The library car was a Chevrolet K5 Blazer, while the neighborhood EV was a 1974 Volkswagen Beetle In an article by Wired magazine it was estimated that profits, both financial and societal was possible if the ecohawks project was replicated on a larger scale

The ecohawks also proposed a plan to take the vehicles completely off grid. They installed six monocrystalline solar cells on their workspace and charged the cars from it, with no energy taken from the grid. Their workspace does not have an HVAC system, but uses biodiesel space heater. In addition, all small appliances are powered by solar energy. Later the group formulated a plan to make money from selling excess energy generated from the integrated renewable energy systems and optimizing the uses through a smart grid technology, i.e. the car would be a power plant by itself. Considering a finite range for an electric vehicle, and estimating that only a fraction is used for daily purposes, looking at the statistic for Kansas, the team proposed that they could potentially use wind energy at night to charge the battery pack.

During the day, a plug in solar carport would be constructed and depending on the needs of the electric grid, power can be drawn from the solar carport and from the vehicle battery pack to augment, or even completely supply the grid. Keeping enough charge for the car to get home, the consumer of the EV would actually be able to profit by giving the excess miles during the day as a supply to the grid. This process was showcased to the US EPA in Washington D.C., in 2010. In February 2011, city officials of Lawrence, Douglas County declared that the university would be getting an electric car charging station. The group made the first unofficial charging station in May 2010.

Education Programs (K-12)

The group hosts and organizes various education programs and projects for the surrounding schools.

== See also ==
- Element One
- Sustainable transport
- Neighborhood electric vehicle
- Electrocar
- Dual-mode vehicle
- Hybrid electric vehicle
- Solar-charged vehicle
- Plug-in electric vehicle
