= Laurie Perry Cookingham =

American public administrator (1896–1992)

Personal details
- Born: October 6, 1896 Chicago, Illinois, U.S.
- Died: July 22, 1992 (aged 95) Kansas City, Missouri, U.S.
- Resting place: Forest Hill Calvary Cemetery; Kansas City, Missouri, U.S.
- Spouse: Harriette L. West (m. 1921; died 1987)
- Education: Detroit Institute of Technology (M.S.)

Military service
- Allegiance: United States
- Branch/service: United States Army
- Years of service: 1918–1919
- Unit: Signal Corps
- Battles/wars: World War I

Laurie Perry Cookingham, more commonly known as L.P. Cookingham or L. Perry Cookingham, (October 6, 1896 – July 22, 1992) was a noted public administrator in the United States having served as city manager of Kansas City, Missouri for 19 years. He also served as city manager of Clawson, Michigan, Plymouth, Michigan, Saginaw, Michigan and Fort Worth, Texas.

== Early life ==
Laurie Perry Cookingham was born in Chicago, Illinois on October 6, 1896, to Emma Emilia (née Gordonier) and Joseph Fitch Cookingham. His father was a bridge superintendent for a railroad. At the age of eight, Cookingham and his family moved to Danville, Illinois. He graduated from Danville High School in 1917. He worked for a railroad in Danville after graduating high school. In 1918, during World War I, he joined the U.S. Army and served in the Signal Corps until 1919. Cookingham received a bachelor's degree in civil engineering from the Detroit Institute of Technology. Later, in 1938, he graduated with a Master of Science from the Detroit Institute of Technology.

== Career ==
After leaving the Army in 1919, Cookingham returned to work for the railroad at Danville and then became a bookkeeper in Flint, Michigan. Cookingham began working in 1920 as an engineer in the public-works department of Flint, Michigan. In 1927, he was the first city manager of Clawson, Michigan. He also served as chief of police and health officer. In 1930, Cookingham was elected as president of the Michigan City Managers Association. In 1931, he was named city manager of Plymouth, Michigan. From 1933 to 1934, Cookingham served as deputy administrator of the Federal Emergency Relief Association in Wayne County, Michigan. He also served as director of the work division of the same association.

Cookingham served as the first City Manager of Saginaw, Michigan, after that city adopted a new city charter providing for the council-manager form of government in 1935. He served in this post from January 6, 1936 until May 14, 1940. In 1937, Cookingham became vice president of the International City/County Management Association. He became president in 1939.

== City Manager of Kansas City ==
Kansas City had switched to the city manager form of government in the 1926, ostensibly to improve efficiency. However, big city boss Tom Pendergast was to install a puppet city manager as the first city manager, in the form of Henry F. McElroy.

The Pendergast/McElroy combine was to usher in a glory era in which much of the city infrastructure, including Kansas City City Hall, Municipal Auditorium (Kansas City), Nelson Art Gallery, was built and Kansas City Jazz was to thrive during a period of lax to non-existent enforcement of liquor laws. However, the era was also marked by patronage jobs and no-bid contracts, all covered up by McElroy's "country bookkeeping." The era ended in 1940 with Pendergast pleading guilty to income tax evasion. McElroy had died shortly after leaving office in 1939.

Following the city election of 1940, a new city council hired Cookingham to reform Kansas City’s administration. He took office on June 10, 1940. Cookingham entered office with the city $20 million in debt. Within six months, he had trimmed the payroll by 2,000 and within a year and a half he had eliminated the city's debt. He was to oversee a period when Kansas City through annexations more than doubled in area from 60 to 130 square miles (340 km^{2}) —- mostly north of the Missouri River.

The Great Flood of 1951 destroyed much of Kansas City's industrial base —- devastating the Kansas City Stockyards and destroying major facilities belonging to the city's two home-based airlines -- Mid-Continent Airlines and TWA. Cookingham oversaw the construction of a brand new jet port north of the Missouri River, which would become Kansas City International Airport, including the construction of a city-owned overhaul base that was leased back to TWA to repair its worldwide fleet of planes. The freeway system in the Kansas City metropolitan area is credited in large part to Cookingham’s planning.

The City Council forced Cookingham to resign. He tendered his resignation on April 16, 1959, and it became official on June 30, 1959. During this period, he was on "terminal leave" and an interim city manager was appointed. Within the next four years, Kansas City had nine city managers.

== Post Kansas City ==
After leaving Kansas City, Cookingham became city manager of Fort Worth, Texas. He served as city manager from 1959 to 1963. After which, he retired and returned to Kansas City and served as executive director of the People to People Program from 1963 to 1967. He became a member and then president of the Board of Kansas City Parks and Recreation Commission. He worked as an adjunct professor at the University of Missouri–Kansas City. He served as a consultant to Kansas City architect firm HNTB.

In 1986, the City of Saginaw invited Cookingham to participate in celebrations marking the 50th anniversary of the council-manager city charter in recognition of his contributions made to that city in which he was also highly regarded. During the occasion, a time capsule was buried near the entrance to Saginaw’s City Hall scheduled to be opened in 2036.

== Personal life ==
Cookingham married Harriette L. West on January 2, 1921. She died in 1987.

Cookingham died on July 22, 1992, at St. Luke's Hospital in Kansas City, at the age of 95. He was buried at Forest Hill Calvary Cemetery in Kansas City.

== Legacy ==
In 1951, Cookingham was the first person given the LaGuardia Memorial Award . In 1976, Cookingham Road, the main road into Kansas City International Airport, was named for him. In 1978, the International City Management Association published a book titled This City, This Man: The Cookingham Era in Kansas City about his work as city manager in Kansas City.

The University of Missouri–Kansas City conferred upon him the honorary degree Doctor of Humane Letters on May 12, 1979 and later named the L.P. Cookingham Institute of Urban Affairs at the Henry W. Bloch School of Management, UMKC after him.
