= Native American recognition in the United States =

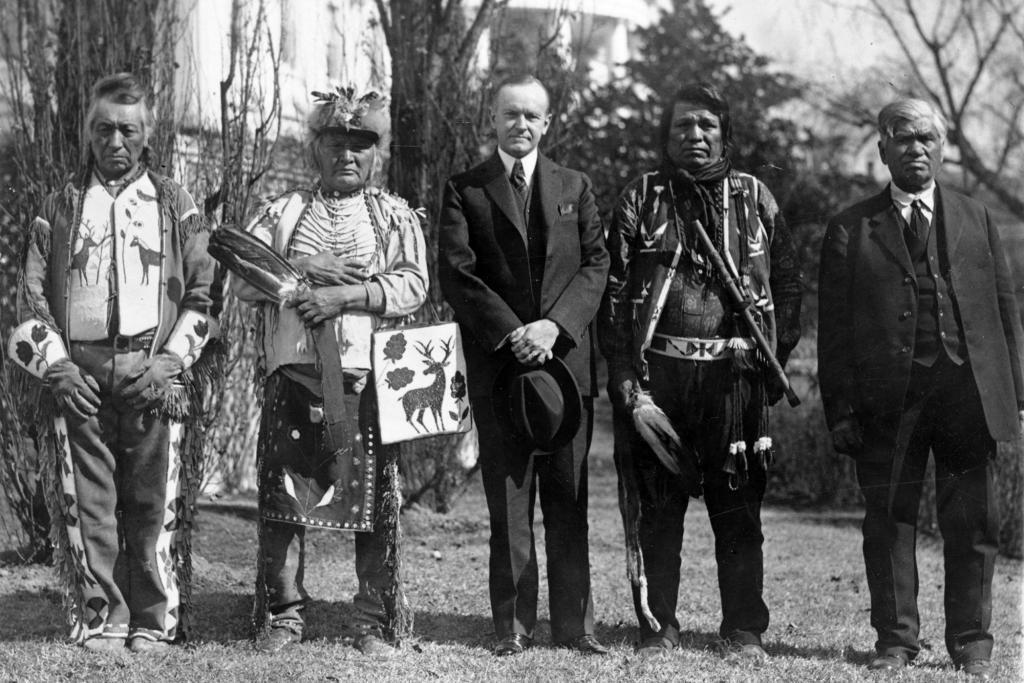
President Coolidge stands with four Osage Indians at a White House ceremony.

Native American recognition in the United States, for tribes, usually means being recognized by the United States federal government as a community of Indigenous people that has been in continual existence since prior to European contact, and which has a sovereign, government-to-government relationship with the federal government of the United States. In the United States, the Native American tribe is a fundamental unit of sovereign tribal government. This recognition comes with various rights and responsibilities. The United States recognizes the right of these tribes to self-government and supports their tribal sovereignty and self-determination. These tribes possess the right to establish the legal requirements for membership. They may form their own government, enforce laws (both civil and criminal), tax, license and regulate activities, zone, and exclude people from tribal territories. Limitations on tribal powers of self-government include the same limitations applicable to states; for example, neither tribes nor states have the power to make war, engage in foreign relations, or coin money.

State-recognized tribes in the United States are Native American tribes or heritage groups that do not meet the criteria for federally recognized Indian tribes but have been recognized by a process established under assorted state government laws for varying purposes or by governor's executive orders. State recognition does not dictate whether or not they are recognized as Native American tribes by continually existing tribal nations. Members of a state-recognized tribe are still subject to state law and government, and the tribe does not have sovereign control over its affairs. Such state recognition has at times been opposed by federally recognized tribes. For instance, the Cherokee Nation opposes state-recognized tribes, as well as Cherokee heritage groups and others with no documented descent who claim Cherokee identity.

Other groups that identify as being Native American tribes but lack federal or state recognition, or recognition by the extant tribes, are listed in the List of organizations that self-identify as Native American tribes.

As of June 1, 2026, there are 575 tribes legally recognized by the Bureau of Indian Affairs (BIA) of the United States, 229 of which are located in Alaska. On the state level, in late 2007 about 16 states had recognized 62 tribes. According to the National Conference of State Legislatures, only 14 states recognized tribes at the state level by 2017.

== Federal recognition of tribes ==
Bureau of Indian Affairs seal

In order to become a federally recognized, tribes must meet certain requirements. The Bureau of Indian affairs defines a federally recognized tribe as an American Indian or Alaska Native tribal entity that is recognized having a government-to-government relationship with the United States, with the responsibilities, powers, limitations, and obligations attached to that designation, and is eligible for funding and services from the Bureau of Indian Affairs. Moreover, according to the Bureau of Indian Affairs and the Federally Recognized Indian Tribe List Act, there are three ways that an Indian tribe may become federally recognized: by act of Congress, by the administrative procedures under 25 C.F.R Part 83, or by decision of a United States court. The Bureau also states that if a tribe's relationship with the United States has been expressly terminated by Congress, then it may not go by this federally acknowledgment process. Furthermore, the Federally Recognized Indian Tribe List Act also requires the Secretary of the Interior to publish annually a list of the federally recognized tribes in the Federal Register.

Today there are 574 groups (bands and tribes) recognized as Native American by the government. Those tribes which have already achieved federal recognition do not want the process made easier. Some spokesmen discuss what other kinds of groups might be encouraged, without encroaching on the recognized tribes. Cherokee Nation spokesman Mike Miller suggests that people with an interest in Indian culture can form heritage groups. Federally recognized tribes are suspicious of non-recognized tribes' efforts to gain acknowledgment, concerned that they may dilute already limited federal benefits. As casino gambling has raised tribal revenues dramatically, there is more competition by tribal groups to gain federal recognition and the right to operate gaming on reservations. Gaining recognition also is a way for Native American groups to assert their identity, their Indianness.

Tribes were originally recognized as legal parties through treaties, executive orders, or presidential proclamations. The 1934 Indian Reorganization Act played a major role in the development of the concept of federal recognition. It provided recognition to those tribes with which the government already had a relationship. Under its provisions, some non-federally recognized tribes were enabled to become federally recognized.

During the 1960s and early 1970s, dozens of groups that lacked federal acknowledgment came forward to demand their rights as native peoples. In the east, groups like the Mashpee Wampanoag filed suit for lands lost in preceding generations. In the west, groups sought fishing rights. In the southeast, others came to demand the government recognize them as surviving aboriginal peoples. As federal tribal status allowed groups standing to bring claims and many came to see the injustice of denying acknowledgment to indigenous peoples, many parties came to acknowledge the need for more consistent procedures for recognizing tribes left outside the circle. With tribal input, the BIA created its Federal Acknowledgment Process in 1978. Currently known as the Office of Federal Acknowledgment, this entity is the main body charged with deciding which groups are eligible to secure status.

Acknowledgment criteria have been created by regulation based on statute. They are set by the Bureau of Indian Affairs' Branch of Acknowledgment and Research. Since the mid-1970s, representatives of federally recognized tribes have consulted with BIA on these criteria.

To be federally recognized, a group must meet the following:

- "[S]ince 1900, it must comprise a distinct community and have existed as a community from historical times;
- it must have political influence over its members;
- it must have membership criteria; and
- it must have membership that consists of individuals who descend from a historical Indian tribe and who are not enrolled in any other tribe." The existence of persistent political relationship as an aspect of tribal relations is also emphasized.

== State Recognition ==
Some groups that are not federally recognized have state recognition. Various states, most in the East, have a recognition process independent of federal recognition. Some examples of state-recognized tribes are the Lumbee Tribe of North Carolina and the Houma Tribe of Louisiana.

== Terminated recognition ==
In the 1950s and 1960s, the federal government saw certain tribes as sufficiently capable of self-government, and thus "no longer in need of federal supervision." The government terminated its relationship with numerous tribes under this policy, including the Menominees of Wisconsin, and the Klamath of Oregon. Many tribes opposed this, and have sought restoration of recognition. Not all have received restoration and Brownell (2001) reports that the policy has "devastated" many of the groups. In particular, the tribes in California have been heavily affected by the termination era. For example, the Taylorsville Rancheria was established and participated in the IRA, but during the termination era the tribe's land was sold to Plumas county to be used for a park and roping club. The government failed to officially terminate the tribe through an act of congress, but the tribe was not included on the Federally Recognized tribes list. The Taylorsville Rancheria has been in limbo since that time and continues to struggle for their restored status as a recognized tribe.

== Recognition of individuals ==
People who self-identify as Indian but who did not grow up in a Native American community may express a desire to join a tribe, whether or not they know the criteria for being considered Native American. The tribal governments, as sovereign nations, have sole jurisdiction over citizenship requirements. Holly Reckord, an anthropologist who heads the BIA Branch of Acknowledgment and Recognition, discusses the most common outcome for those who seek membership: "We check and find that they haven't a trace of Indian ancestry, yet they are still totally convinced that they are Indians. Even if you have a trace of Indian blood, why do you want to select that for your identity, and not your Irish or Italian? It's not clear why, but at this point in time, a lot of people want to be Indian."

The 1978 American Indian Religious Freedom Act uses a two-part definition which is especially influential. It defines an Indian as a person who belongs to an Indian Tribe, which in turn is a group that "is recognized as eligible for the special programs and services provided by the United States to Indians because of their status as Indians."

U.S. Government agencies have had varied definitions of "Indian" over time. According to a 1978 congressional survey, there were upwards of 33 separate definitions of "Indian" used in federal legislation at that time. In 1997, the National Center for Health Statistics assigned the mother's race to a child born to parents of different "races"; when people gave multiracial responses to questions of heritage, only the first race was entered. In 2002, the number of definitions increased when tribal enrollment statutes were included.

The United States Census allows citizens to check any ethnicity without requirements of validation. The census allows individuals to self-identify as Indian, merely by checking the racial category, "Native American/Alaska Native". In 1990, about 1.8 million people self-identified in the census as American Indian. But only about 60 percent of those, or 1.14 million people, were enrolled in federally recognized tribes.

In 2001, federally recognized tribes saw the number of enrolled members increasing rapidly. This was seen as both due to birthrates, but also due to social activism and a resurgence of pride in Native American heritage and cultural preservation.

=== Historic judicial and legislative definitions of "Indian" ===
Federal courts have not universally required membership in federally recognized tribes for a person to be classified as Indian. At times a person's membership in a federally recognized tribe was not sufficient for classification as Indian in the eyes of the courts.

The Major Crimes Act of 1885 placed seven major crimes under federal jurisdiction if committed by a Native American in Native American Territory. The Department of Justice required that a defendant be an enrolled member of a tribe to be covered by the Major Crimes Act.

In his 1935 Memorandum to John Collier, Commissioner of Indian Affairs, the Assistant Solicitor, Felix S. Cohen, discussed the rights of a group of non-tribal Indians under the Indian Reorganization Act. This Act defined a person as Indian based on three criteria, tribal membership, ancestral descent, or blood quantum. (Cohen said of the group now known as the Lumbee Tribe of North Carolina, recognized by the state of North Carolina: "[Clearly this group is not a] federally recognized Indian tribe. Neither are the members of this group residents of an Indian reservation.")

In the 1930s when it was more involved in determining classification of American Indians, the federal government used five factors to certify individuals who claimed to be more than half-blood Indian: tribal rolls, testimony of the applicant, affidavits from people familiar with the applicant, findings of an anthropologist, and testimony of the applicant that he has retained "a considerable measure of Indian culture and habits of living." The attempt to use physical characteristics to define Indians created some paradoxical situations. In 1939, for example, the BIA sent Harvard anthropologist Carl Selzer to Robeson County, North Carolina to review the claims of the Lumbee, who were of mixed-race descent. Using methods of assessment then used in physical anthropology, but since discounted, "He measured their features and put a pencil in each Indian's hair, noting 'Indian' blood if the pencil slipped through and 'Negroid' if it did not. The absurd results of his study listed children as Indian while omitting their parents, and placing brothers and sisters on opposite sides of the half-blood line."

=== Political definition based in citizenship ===
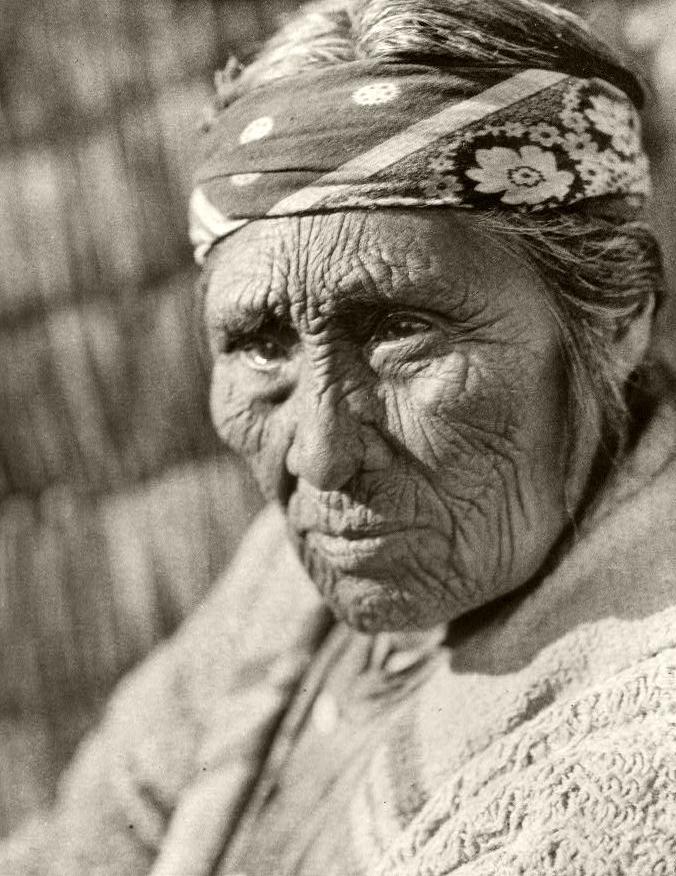
Klamath woman elder by Edward S. Curtis, 1924

Native American identity is determined by the tribal nation the individual belongs to, or seeks to belong to. While it is common for non-Natives to consider it a racial or ethnic identity, it is considered by Native Americans in the United States to be a political identity, based in citizenship and immediate family relationships. As culture can vary widely between the 574 extant federally recognized tribes in the United States, the idea of a single unified "Native American" racial identity is a European construct that does not have an equivalent in tribal thought. While some groups and individuals seek to self-identify as Native American, self-identification on its own is not recognized by legitimate tribes.

Native American concerns over equal protection and tribal sovereignty led the federal government to reduce its role as arbiter of race-based eligibility standards. This policy of allowing tribes self-determination on membership, as well as other aspects of their lives, has developed since the Nixon administration in the 1970s. The pivotal legislation of the era was the Indian Self-Determination and Education Assistance Act of 1975, which began the government's process of transferring authority for administering federal grants and programs for Indians to tribal governments. Senator Daniel K. Inouye, Chairman of the Senate Select Committee on Indian Affairs, said in 1994 that, "Sovereignty, the inherent right of self-government and self-determination, is the focal point in all Indian issues."

The government has shifted to the "political" definitions, by which legislation has defined Indians based on membership in federally recognized tribes. This allows the tribes to determine the meaning of "Indianness" based on their own citizenship criteria. Some criticize the federal government's interference even in this limited way, as still setting certain conditions on the nature of membership criteria.

The Indian Arts and Crafts Act of 1990 may be the only recent federal Indian legislation that was, at all stages of legislative deliberation, supported by Indians. This law requires that only Indians be allowed to market their handicrafts as "Indian made" and to be sold at Indian crafts fairs. This was to halt the economic loss to Indians due to questionable and fraudulent claims of this sort, which was estimated between $400 and $800 million a year. In the Act, "Indian" is described as "any individual who is a member of an Indian tribe; or for the purpose of this section is certified as an Indian artisan by an Indian tribe." This definition of "tribe" also includes state-recognized tribes.

The 1994 federal legislation, the American Indian Religious Freedom Act, gives another common definition, defining an Indian as one who belongs to an Indian tribe, which is a group that "is recognized as eligible for the special programs and services provided by the United States to Indians because of their status as Indians." The result of there being multiple legal definitions of Indian is that one may be eligible to receive educational grants, but not health benefits, one may be eligible to be chief of a tribe but not to obtain a Bureau of Indian Affairs loan or an Indian scholarship to a state university.

=== Disenrollment ===
Disenrollment is when an individual loses their citizenship status with a Native American tribe. When this happens, they lose any government benefits they may have been receiving (not all citizens receive benefits). Some who have been disenrolled feel it affected their sense of self/identity.

In 2013, the tribal council of the Nooksack people disenrolled 306 people, and refused to enroll several others, citing lack of documentation. Thirty-seven were elders.

An individual may be ejected by a tribe, sometimes for serious offenses.

Disenrollments by small tribes with casino income are sometimes seen as suspicious.

Some Native American communities have prohibited disenrollment.

== Bibliography ==
- Barrett, Barbara. (2007) "Two N.C. tribes fight for identity; Delegation split on Lumbee recognition" The News & Observer (Raleigh, North Carolina) April 19, 2007
- Bonney, Rachel A. (1977) "The Role of AIM Leaders in Indian Nationalism". American Indian Quarterly, Vol. 3, No. 3. (Autumn, 1977), pp. 209–224.
- Bordewich, Fergus M. (1996) Killing the White Man's Indian: Reinventing Native Americans at the End of the Twentieth Century. First Anchor Books, ISBN 0-385-42036-6
- Brownell, Margo S. (2001) "Who is an Indian? Searching for an Answer to the Question at the Core of Federal Indian Law". Michigan Journal of Law Reform 34(1-2):275-320.
- Carpenter, Cari. (2005) "Detecting Indianness: Gertrude Bonnin's Investigation of Native American Identity". Wíčazo Ša Review - Volume 20, Number 1, Spring 2005, pp. 139–159
- Carter, Kent. (1988) "Wantabes and Outalucks: Searching for Indian Ancestors in Federal Records". Chronicles of Oklahoma 66 (Spring 1988): 99-104 (Accessed June 30, 2007 here Archived 2016-08-10 at the Wayback Machine)
- Cohen, F. (1982) Handbook of Federal Indian law. Charlottesville: Bobbs-Merrill, ISBN 0-87215-413-0
- Dyar, Jennifer. (2003) "Fatal Attraction: The White Obsession with Indianness". The Historian. June 2003. Vol 65 Issue 4 pages 817–836
- Etheridge, Tiara. (2007) "Displacement, loss still blur American Indian identities" April 25, 2007 Wednesday, Oklahoma Daily, University of Oklahoma
- Field, W. Les (with the Muwekma Ohlone Tribe). (2003) "Unacknowledged Tribes, Dangerous Knowledge, The Muwekma Ohlone and How Indian Identities Are 'Known.'" Wíčazo Ša Review 18.2 pages 79–94
- Garroutte, Eva Marie. (2003) Real Indians: identity and the survival of Native America. University of California Press, ISBN 0-520-22977-0
- Gercken-Hawkins, Becca (2003) "'Maybe you only look white:' Ethnic Authority and Indian Authenticity in Academia". The American Indian Quarterly 27.1&2 pages 200-202
- Hall, Stuart. (1997) "The work of representation". In Representation: Cultural Representations and Signifying Practices, ed. Stuart Hall, 15–75. London: Sage Publications, ISBN 0-7619-5432-5
- Horse, Perry G. (2005) "Native American identity" New Directions for Student Services. Volume 2005, Issue 109, Pages 61 – 68
- Lawrence, Bonita. (2003) "Gender, Race, and the Regulation of Native Identity in Canada and the United States: An Overview" Hypatia 18.2 pages 3–31
- Miller, Mark Edwin. Forgotten Tribes: Unrecognized Indians and the Federal Acknowledgment Process. Lincoln: University of Nebraska Press, 2004.
- Nagel, J. (1995) "Politics and the Resurgence of American Indian Ethnic Identity", American Sociological Review 60: 947–965.
- Paredes, J. Anthony. (1995) "Paradoxes of Modernism and Indianness in the Southeast". American Indian Quarterly, Vol. 19, No. 3. (Summer, 1995), pp. 341–360.
- Peroff, Nicholas C. (1997) "Indian Identity" The Social Science Journal, Volume 34, Number 4, pages 485–494.
- Nicholas Peroff (2002) "Who is an American Indian?" Social Science Journal. Volume 39, Number 3, pages 349
- Pierpoint, Mary. (2000) "Unrecognized Cherokee claims cause problems for nation". Indian Country Today. August 16, 2000 (Accessed May 16, 2007 here)
- Porter, F.W. III (ed.) (1983). "Nonrecognized American Indian tribes: An historical and legal perspective". Occasional Paper Series No. 7. Chicago, IL: D'Arcy McNickle Center for the History of the American Indian, The Newberry Library.
- Ray, S. Alan. A Race or a Nation? Cherokee National Identity and the Status of Freedmen's Descendants. Michigan Journal of Race and Law. Vol. 12, p. 387, 2007 (Accessible on SSRN as of March 21, 2008 A Race or a Nation? Cherokee National Identity and the Status of Freedmen's Descendants).
- Russell, Steve. (2004) "Review of Real Indians: Identity and the Survival of Native America" PoLAR: Political and Legal Anthropology Review. May 2004, Vol. 27, No. 1, pp. 147–153
- Russell, Steve (2002). "Apples are the Color of Blood". Critical Sociology Vol. 28, 1, 2002, p. 65
- Schulz, Amy J. (1998) "Navajo Women and the Politics of Identity". Social Problems, Vol. 45, No. 3. (Aug., 1998), pp. 336–355.
- Sheffield, Gail (1998) Arbitrary Indian: The Indian Arts and Crafts Act of 1990. University of Oklahoma Press ISBN 0-8061-2969-7
- Sturm, Circe. (1998) "Blood Politics, Racial Classification, and Cherokee National Identity: The Trials and Tribulations of the Cherokee Freedmen". American Indian Quarterly, Winter/Spring 1998, Vol 22. No 1&2 pgs 230-258
- Thornton, Russell. (1992) The Cherokees: A Population History. University of Nebraska Press, ISBN 0-8032-9410-7
- Thornton, Russell. (1997) "Tribal Membership Requirements and the Demography of 'Old' and 'New' Native Americans". Population Research and Policy Review Vol. 16, Issue 1, p. 33 ISBN 0-8032-4416-9
- "Census 2000 PHC-T-18. American Indian and Alaska Native Tribes in the United States: 2000" United States Census Bureau, Census 2000, Special Tabulation (Accessed May 27, 2007 here)
- "State-Tribal Relations: Indian Tribe States", ncls.org, (2007) National Council of State Legislatures (Accessible as of July 16, 2007 here)
