= Nicholas Peroff =

Nicholas C. Peroff
- Born: May 19, 1944 (age 82); Wisconsin, United States
- Education: University of Wisconsin-Madison
- Known for: Complexity theory Native American studies Public management Policy analysis
- Scientific career
- Fields: Political science Public administration
- Workplaces: University of Missouri - Kansas City; Haskell Indian Nations University; University of the Western Cape; Keimyung University

Nicholas C. Peroff (born May 19, 1944) is an American political scientist, public administrator and professor in Native American studies and complexity theory at the Henry W. Bloch School of Management at the University of Missouri-Kansas City; he formerly held teaching positions in Taiwan, South Korea and South Africa.

The secretary of International Relations Council, he is the former president of the World Social Science Association (2002–2003). A veteran of the Vietnam War, he was named Public Administrator of the Year, Kansas City, by the American Society for Public Administration in 2009.

== Background ==
Born and raised in Wisconsin, US, he received a B.A., M.A. and Ph.D. in political science (on a Ford Fellowship) from the University of Wisconsin-Madison. His doctoral study was interrupted with the onset of the Vietnam War, to which he was drafted as a member of the U.S. Navy serving on USS Forrestal (CV-59) during the fire (1967–1968) as division officer. In 1986 he was an instructor at the Chinese Ministry of Economic Affairs.

His book Menominee Drums, Tribal Termination and Restoration, 1954–1974 (University of Oklahoma Press), was a study of the termination and subsequent restoration of federal recognition of the Menominee Indian Tribe of Wisconsin. His work with the Menominee Nation has continued, off and on, for over 30 years, which led him to research Indian gaming and other areas of interest within American Indian studies. He also researched and taught public management and administration, public policy analysis, and engaged in the development and application of complexity theory in the study of American Indian policy.

== Awards ==
- Elmer P. Pierson Teaching Award, Bloch School, 1986–87.
- Marquis Who's Who, February 2008

== See also ==
- New England Complex Systems Institute
- Menominee Tribe v. United States
- Native American recognition in the United States
- Menominee Restoration Act
- Native American identity in the United States
- Indian termination policy
