= Formula Zero =

Hydrogen fuel cell racing series

Formula Zero was an organization based out of Amsterdam in the Netherlands and was founded in 2003. Its vision was to demonstrate that zero emissions technology can be both fun and sustainable at the same time by racing to get people interested in hydrogen fuel cell technology. In 2005, Formula Zero began construction of the Mark 2, the world's first fully functional fuel-cell powered go-kart using ultracapacitors for energy storage. On October 26, 2006, the Mark 2 set an official FIA record of 1/8 of a mile in 11.869 seconds. The Mark 2 was featured on the Discovery Channel as a part of the FutureCar television series. Formula Zero set a new FIA record with the Mark 2 in September 2007.

The 2008 Formula Zero Championship was the world's first hydrogen fuel cell race series. The first race series consisted of six universities from all over the world competing in time-trialed races on a two-mile mobile race track. Potential race locations include London, Spain and several other international cities, including one in the USA (South Carolina, March 2009). The Championship began on August 22, 2008 in Rotterdam, the Netherlands.

In March 2011, the Formula Zero Championship project was shut down with no further events planned.

== Competing teams ==
| Team | University | Country |
|---|---|---|
| Element One | Lawrence Technological University | United States |
| Greenchoice Forze | TU Delft | The Netherlands |
| Imperial Racing Green | Imperial College London | United Kingdom |
| EUPLATech2 | EUPLA | Spain |
| Zero Emission Racing Team | Groep T | Belgium |
| HercUCLAs | University of California-Los Angeles | United States |
