= Forze =

Electric vehicle racing team in Delft

Forze Hydrogen Electric Racing Team Delft
- Stichting Formula Zero Team Delft
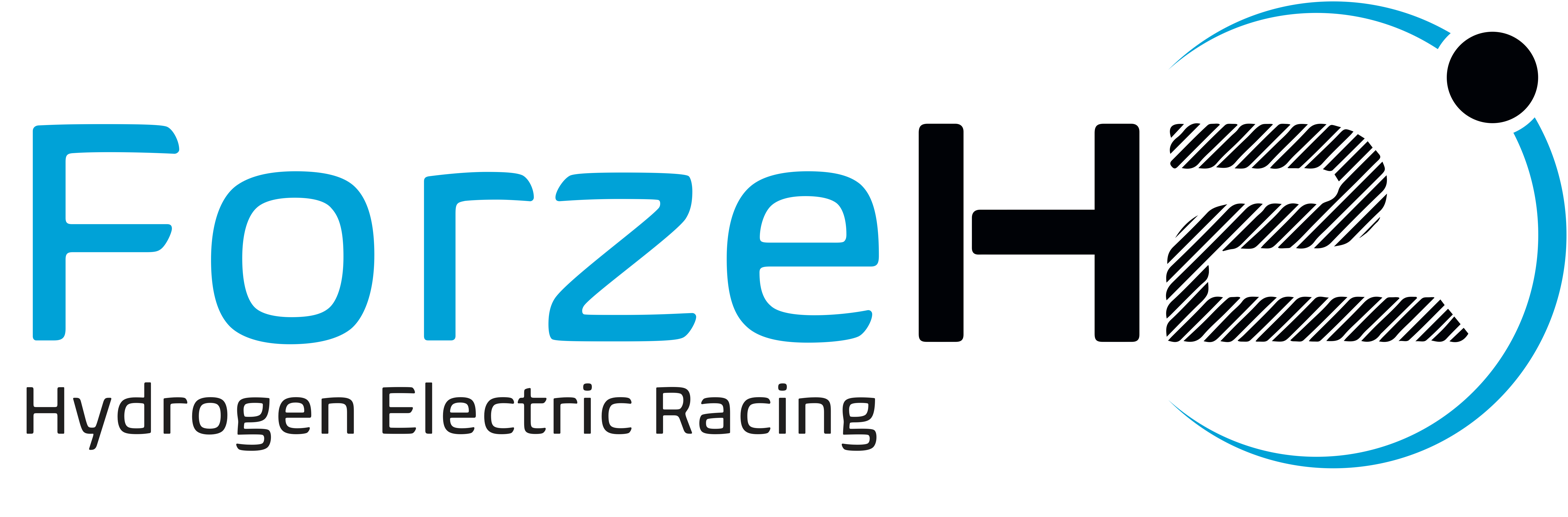

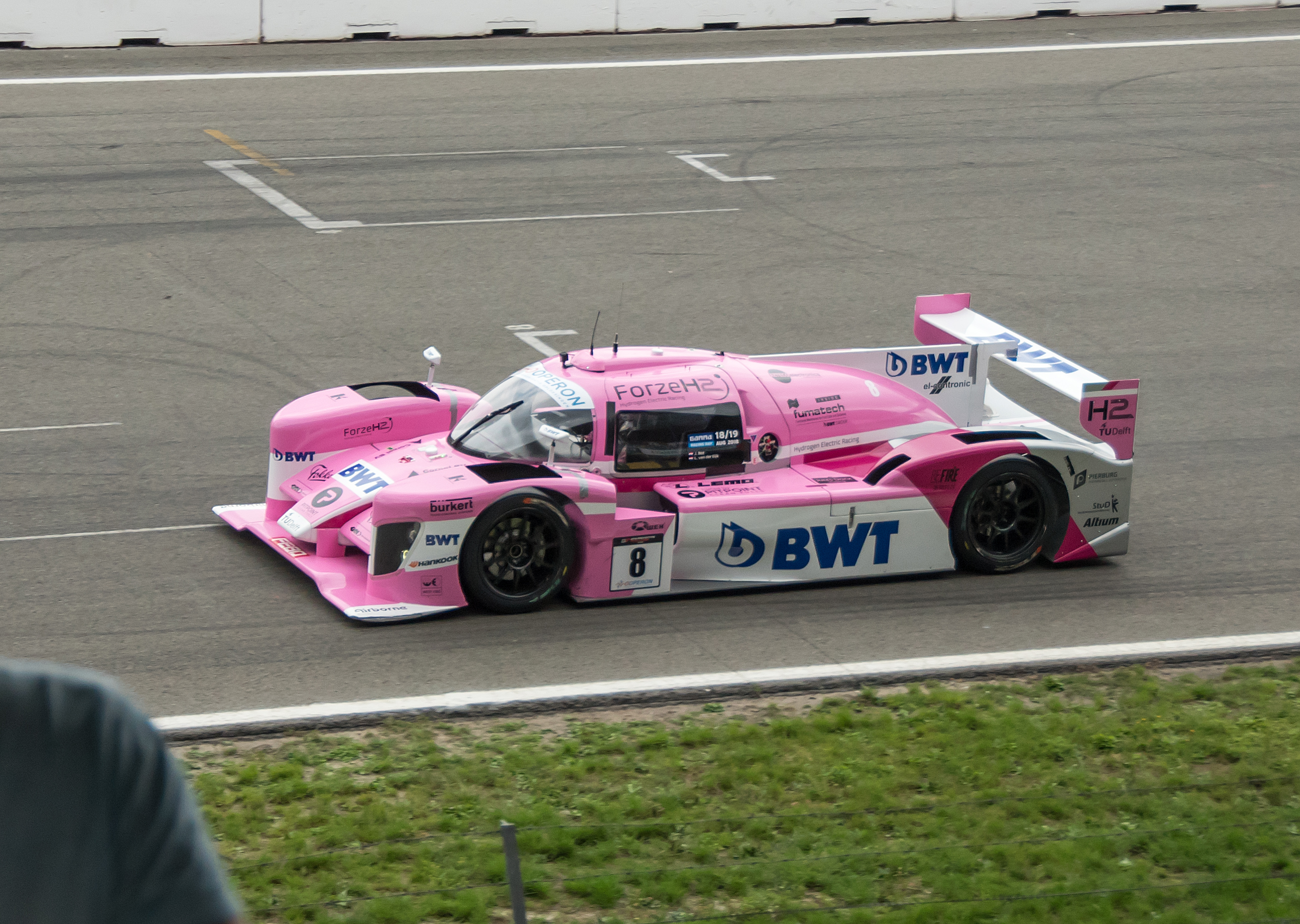
- Forze VIII at Gamma Racing Days 2018
- Founder: Edgar van Os, 2007
- Location(s): Schieweg 15D, 2627AN Delft, Netherlands
- Website: www.forze-delft.nl

Forze Hydrogen Racing is a hydrogen electric vehicle racing team. It is run by students and was founded at the Delft University of Technology in 2007 by Edgar van Os and has built 8 hydrogen fuel cell racing vehicles. The team's offices and workshops are located at the Schiehal in Delft. In 2007, the team began designing and building go-karts with a hydrogen-electric drivetrain. With these vehicles they participated in the Formula Zero competition, hence the name ForZe. After five years the first full-size hydrogen race car was built, the Forze VI. Another three years later the project of the Forze VII began. This became the first hydrogen-electric racecar to ever participate in an official race against fossil-fueled vehicles. The latest iteration, the Forze VIII, was the first hydrogen-electric race car to ever beat petrol powered cars, and came in 2nd place at the Gamma Racing Days in Assen in 2019. Over the coming years the team wants to develop its cars in such a way that they can compete in a Le Mans Prototype endurance series.

== Hydrogen ==
In a conventional road car, the energy that is stored in fuel is converted to mechanical energy, using the principle of combustion. The cars that are built by Forze utilize a different concept. The hydrogen fuel cell system inside the vehicles converts the energy stored in hydrogen to electric energy. This means that the fuel cell system can be used to power an electric drive train with hydrogen as a so-called alternative fuel.

The efficiency of the fuel conversion can be about two to three times higher than a conventional combustion engine. The most obvious differences of hydrogen-electric vehicles compared to their battery-electric relatives is the time required to recharge or refill, and the driving range. Hydrogen tanks can be refilled within minutes whereas batteries currently take several hours to recharge. This makes hydrogen-electric propulsion ideal for applications where non-stop operation and/or a long driving range is required.

The mission of Forze is to promote fuel cell technology by educating their own team members, but also the general public and to inspire industries to use hydrogen technology. By designing and building their own high performance hydrogen race cars, the potential and application of hydrogen can be demonstrated. Currently, Forze is still the only student team worldwide that uses high power automotive fuel cells.

== Cars & Competitions ==
=== Formula Zero ===
The team started competing in the 2008 Formula Zero Championship, the world's first hydrogen fuel cell championship. Given the importance of the upcoming Hydrogen economy and considering climate change and oil related problems, the project draws a lot of attention from international media.

The first season was limited to one event in the inner city of Rotterdam next to the Erasmus Bridge. The second season consisted of a European Cup and a separate Grand Prix in the city center of Turin. The third season again only had one race, held the center of The Hague.

=== Formula Student ===
The Formula Zero competition did not prove to grow into what it promised to be during the first years. The team continued to innovate and moved on to the Formula Student competition. The Forze IV and V vehicles were purpose built for this competition. To this day, Forze is still the only student team that has competed with a fuel cell powered kart.

=== Supercar Challenge ===
After competing in the Formula Student race twice, Forze made a big step towards the professional racing world. The next car, the Forze VI, became world's first full-size race car powered by hydrogen. Due to the lack of a FIA license for the Forze VI, registering for official races was difficult, and the car did not compete in any FIA backed competitions. To avoid this problem, the Forze VII featured an FIA licensed LMP3-monocoque from ADESS AG. With it, the team built the first hydrogen race car ever to compete against fossil fueled combustion vehicles in an official race. The Forze VII competed in the Supercar Challenge in 2017 during the Gamma Racing Days on the TT Circuit Assen. In the 45-minute race, the Forze VII set the third fastest lap time in the Sports division, showing its potential. Unfortunately though, the hydrogen-electric race car was not able to drive the full race as it only had fuel on board for 30 minutes.

One year later, in 2018, the Forze VIII drove the full 60-minute race at the Supercar Challenge 2018 during the Gamma Racing Days on TT Circuit Assen. In August 2019, the Forze VIII competed in the same race and came in second place in the sports division.

In 2022, Forze revealed the Forze IX, with an aim to compete in the GT Class of the Supercar Challenge. This car got its first outing at the Jack's Racing Days in August 2025. While still in development, it competed in a special class, taking part in the sunday race of the Supercar Challenge.

== Competition results ==
Date	Race	Car	Result
23-08-2008	Formula Zero World Championship	Forze I	1st
Summer 2009	Formula Zero European Home Grand Prix	Forze II	3rd
11-10-2009	Formula Zero GP Torino	Forze II	1st
19-08-2010	Formula Zero GP The Hague	Forze III	1st
17-07-2011	Formula Student UK	Forze IV	DNF
15-07-2012	Formula Student UK	Forze V	55th
07-08-2017	Supercar Challenge Sport Division (Gamma Racing Days)	Forze VII	DNF
07-08-2017	Supercar Challenge Garage 56 (Gamma Racing Days)	Forze VII	1st
18-08-2018	Supercar Challenge Sport Division (Gamma Racing Days)	Forze VIII	6th
18-08-2018	Supercar Challenge Garage 56 (Gamma Racing Days)	Forze VIII	1st
14-07-2019	Supercar Challenge Sport Division (Blancpain Sprint World Cup Zandvoort)	Forze VIII	7th
14-07-2019	Supercar Challenge Garage 56 (Blancpain Sprint World Cup Zandvoort)	Forze VIII	1st
18-08-2019	Supercar Challenge Sport Division (Gamma Racing Days)	Forze VIII	2nd
18-08-2019	Supercar Challenge Garage 56 (Gamma Racing Days)	Forze VIII	1st
10-08-2025	Supercar Challenge Garage 56 (Jack's Racing Days)	Forze IX	1st

== World Records ==
The team made several official and unofficial world records attempts to beat the FIA world land speed record for hydrogen powered fuel cell cars under 500 kg on the 1/8th mile.

On 3 October 2010 the team tried to break the world record held by the Formula Zero Mark II at 11.2 seconds. This attempt took place on the island of Aruba on the Palo Marga International Raceway Park. Unfortunately due to heavy rain part of the island flooded and the attempt was pushed to 4 October. In a much smaller time frame with little time to prepare the vehicle for racing, the team managed to set a time of 9.77 seconds.

On 16 August 2011, the team organized an official attempt on the Princess Beatrixlaan in the center of The Hague. With the help of the Knac National Autosport Federation (KNAF) a licensed track to FIA standards was put up. The Forze IV hydrogen vehicle drove a time of 10.45 seconds that day. After several months the FIA ruled that this measured time was not an official land speed record because of an error in the documents submitted by KNAF to the FIA.

In May 2015, the team took the Forze VI to the Nürburgring Nordschleife. With ex-Formula 1 driver Jan Lammers, they broke the fuel cell lap record by over a minute, which was previously owned by the Nissan FCV X-Trail concept. Lammers accomplished a time of 10:42.58. This time still stands as the fastest fuel cell lap time today.

On 17 December 2015, the full-size Forze VI obtained the fastest electric lap record on Circuit Zandvoort with driver and also team member Kevin Schreiber behind the wheel. With a lap time of 2:04.519 the Forze VI has beaten the Tesla Roadster, which was the previous electric lap record holder on the famous Dutch race track. On 4 June 2017 Forze lost the record to InMotion.

== Team ==
All members of the team are both bachelor and master students from a wide range of faculties, including aerospace engineering, mechanical engineering and electrical engineering. Students come from a range of universities like TU Delft, InHolland or Haagse Hogeschool. The size of the team has grown over the years and has varied from forty to sixty students in the last few years. As of June 2026, the 19th team consists of 26 full-time members and is backed by nearly 25 part-timers.

=== Board ===
	2007-2008 Team I	2008-2009 Team II	2009-2010 Team III	2010-2011 Team IV	2011-2012 Team V	2012-2013 Team VI	2013-2014 Team VII	2014-2015 Team VIII	2015-2016 Team IX	2016-2017 Team X	2017-2018 Team XI	2018-2019 Team XII	2019-2020 Team XIII	2020-2021 Team XIV	2021-2022 Team XV	2022-2023 Team XVI	2023-2024 Team XVII	2024-2025 Team XVIII	2025-2026 Team XIX	2026-2027 Team XX
1	Edgar van Os	Ivo Salters	Koen Lubbers	Wouter Krul	Jan Jaap Treurniet	Michel Haak	Ruiz Knöbel	Menno Dalmijn	Rick Everaert	Mats Dirkzwager	Gijs Vermeij	Zhi Wei Cai	Jesper Frijns	Mark Jan Uijl			Eva van der Dijs	Alexander Boersma	Ard Geuze	
2	Koen Legrand	Teunis Schuurman	Edwin De Kreij	Charlie van der Schoor	Andrew Hagens	Albert Mulder	Jonas Brendelberger	Nils Barfknecht	Werner Jousma	Joost Berendsen	Steffen Strübing	Daan Treurniet	Antonio Scoccimarro	Jasper van Dongen			Carmen Hoekstra	Jules Bodegom	Niels van Voorst	
3	Laurens Barten	Leon de Poorter	Hielke Wesdorp	Mart Moerdijk	Matthijs Jansen	Ruben Burger	Remco Duba	Mart van Rijsingen	Marc Bisschop	Sieger Falkena	Sanne Nielsen	Levi de Vries	Anna Noteboom	Gabriel Garcia Aparicio			Maximilian Reinhard	Bram Staps	Bram Benning	
4	Rob Barendse			Bob Wittebrood	Jelle Boersma	Ruben Grandia	Martin Hartvelt	Anton Stoop	Thomas Boogaart	Coen Lastdrager	Karsten Bakker	Joost Wendling	Daphne Stukker	Ron Hochstenbach				Koen Vogels	Nills Peppin	
5				Pieter Danneels	Thomas Arink	Matthijs Damen	Thijs van Winden	Joost Kortleve	Sjoerd van Empelen	Beau Smit	Thomas Barendse	Lorenza Mottinelli	Emiel Hartsema	Alvaro Detailleur			Wessel Albers	Boyd Visser	Cato Versluis	
6				Matthijs Koornneef		Tiemen Joustra	Kevin van Giessen	Jan Bot	Casper van Dien	Colin Heimans	Simon Vermeijlen	Joris Vlasblom	Seymour Lubbers	Sebastiaan Kruit			Eleanore Cammeraat	Lorenza Rubin	Olav van Grinsven	
7						Niels van Duijkeren	Ruben Biesheuvel	Bob Ligtvoet	Jasper Schenk	Mathieu Blanke	Pepijn de Heer	Jonathan Linssen	Tim van de Weijer	Bob Morssink			Didier van der Voort	Coen Buitink	Connor Klein Velthuis	
8						Stefan van Seggelen	Philip Coenen			Oscar Verbeek	Tjebbe de Lint	Maurice Valentijn	Dennis Koens	Coen Holland			Jorick Arends	Lucas Braxhoofden	Olivier Brunner	
9						Kevin Schreiber				Tinie Lam	Christophe Geuens	Andrea de Matteis	Mounir Roodenburg	David Vos			Ties de Vetten	Connor Klein Velthuis	Daan van Gils	
10										Huib Versteegh	Lars Musters	Daniele Tarantini	Lars Talsma	Flint ten Berg			Julia Lakeman	Luuk Daleman	Olivier de Boer	
11										Sander Verhage	Joerie Arkesteijn	Renko Siebols	Pranav Madabhushi	Jikke de Mol van Otterloo			Timo de Kemp	Douwe de Vries	Di	
12											Wouter van Gijseghem	Koen Rodewijk	Martijn Jorissen	Kalyan Wessendorp			Koen Smit	Lynn Taalman	Roos Lemmens	
13											Lode de Herdt	Steven Kortekaas	Thijs Goetzee	Laura Muntenaar			Thomas Huisman	Daniel Jacobs	Ezra Woudenberg	
14											Thom Huisman	Wouter Kleynen	Antoni Plonczak	Max Huting			Olivier Estourgie	Niels van den Berg	Roy Peters	
15											Maurice van der Maas	David Veselka	Otmar Ubbens	Merijn Jongepier			Bart van Maris	Henk Menke	Jelco van Vliet	
16											Jan Maarten Buis	Martijn Eppenga	Bram Kool	Maxime van Kekem			Peter de Bruin	Philip Groenemeijer	Steven Custers	
17											Steijn van Schoor	Simon Beets	Thijmen Langendam	Martijn Loonen			Steven de Rijke	Hugo van den Heijkant	Job van Zwienen	
18											Jelle de Vries	Frank Overes	Rosalie Kievits	Marius van der Bend			Liam Saanen	Renzo Bootsma	Thom Kortenoever	
19													Martin Osowski	Nicolaas du Plessis			Tom van der Wee	Jelmer Brouwer	Katie Sok	
20													Peter Elffers	Noël op 't Land			Steven van de Kamp	Ruben Bogers	Tom Spaans	
21													Tuur Knevels	Noah van der Linden			Yannes van der Pol	Jelte Span	Maurits ten Thije	
22													Niels de Boer	Odile Niers			Tanko Tanev	Ryan Zondag	Vladimir Markov	
23														Ricarda Warnat			Quinten Bongers	Jip Wikkerink	Merijn Everstein	
24														Simon Andreas			Thomas Huisman	Thijs den Bouw	Walter Oosterlee	
25														Sander Blok			Martijn Roos	Jorge Reig Herrero	Miró Bruinsma	
26														Willem van der Vliet			Chiel Weber	Tim Qualm	Yaryna Lonyuk	
27																	Jorick Arends	Joris van Eijk		
28																	Wessel Albers	Tobias Lucas		
29																	Tommaso Longoni	Justine Pentinga		
30																	Yannick Pauwels	Vincent Witte		
31																	Amaryllis Brosens			
32																	Yegor Litvinov			
33																	Anouk van den Bulk			
34																	Otho Granata			
35																	Aryan Nokhai			

=== Drivers ===
During the third season a new team member with karting experience became the third driver for the team. The driver, Charlie van der Schoor, was also more closely involved with the development of the Forze III. In season 4 the team said farewell to Martin Buitelaar as a driver. He was no longer a student and took on a full-time job outside the racing industry. For season 4 the team raced in the Formula Student (UK) competition and therefore needed more drivers to be able to compete in all the events. A selection among the team members was organised by Buitelaar where Marco van't Wout, Arie Nap and Lennert van den Boom were selected. For the 6th season only licensed race car drivers were allowed due to the increased performance of the car.

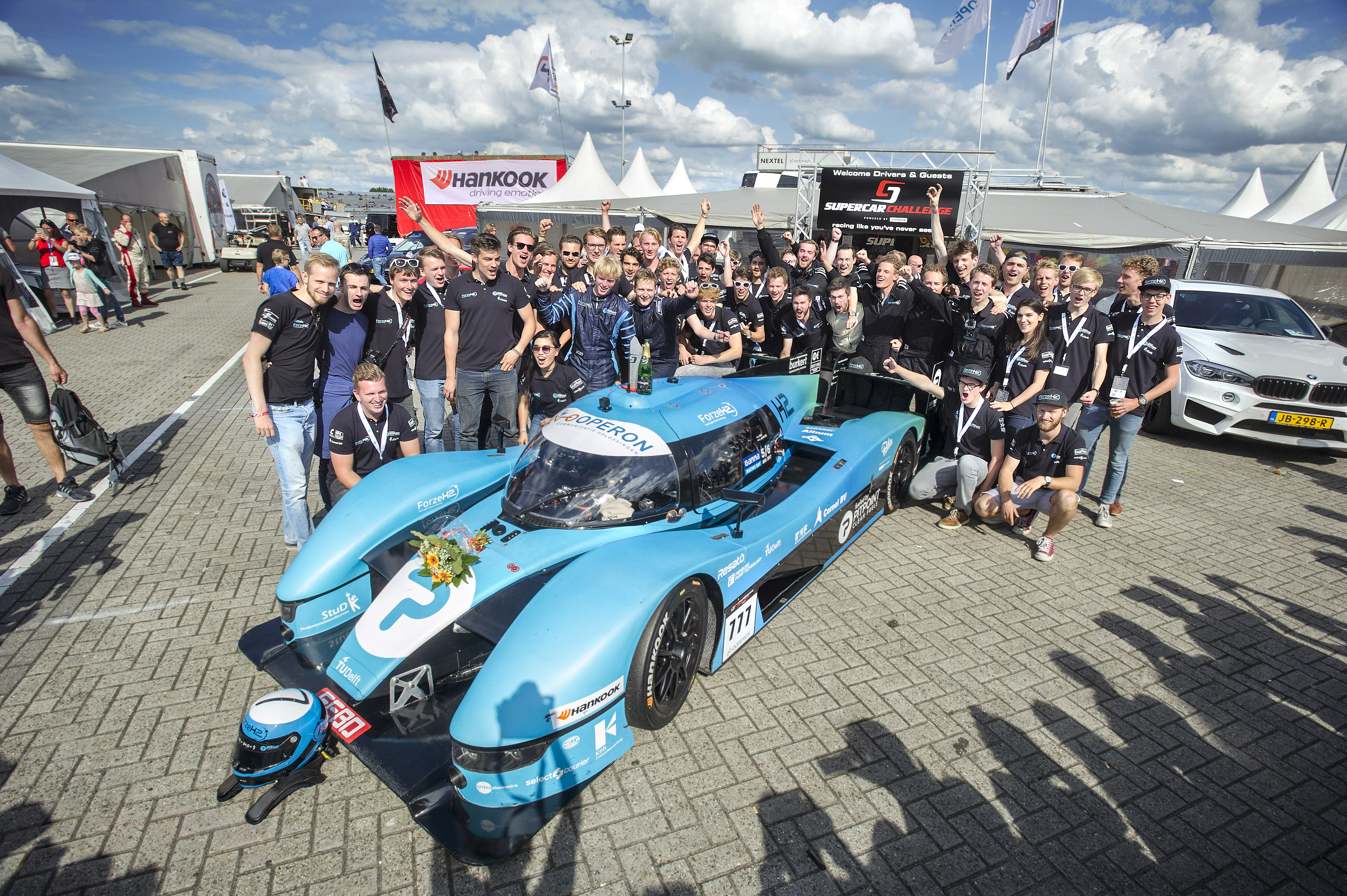
Forze Team at Gamma Racing Days 2017

Driver	2008-2009	2009-2010	2010-2011	2011-2012	2012-2013	2013-2014	2014-2015	2015-2016	2016-2017	2017-2018	2018-2019	2019-2020	2020-2021	2021-2022	2022-2023	2023-2024	2024-2025	2025-2026	2026-2027
1	Martin Buitelaar	Martin Buitelaar	Andrew Hagens	Andrew Hagens	Kevin Schreiber	Kevin Schreiber	Kevin Schreiber	Kevin Schreiber	Kevin Schreiber	Kevin Schreiber	Kevin Schreiber	Kevin Schreiber	Kevin Schreiber	Kevin Schreiber	Kevin Schreiber	Kevin Schreiber	Kevin Schreiber	Kevin Schreiber	Kevin Schreiber
2	Andrew Hagens	Andrew Hagens	Marco van't Wout	Jan Bot	Jan Bot	Jan Bot	Jan Bot	Jan Bot	Jan Bot	Jan Bot	Jan Bot	Jan Bot	Jan Bot	Jan Bot	Jan Bot	Jan Bot	Jan Bot	Jan Bot	Jan Bot
3		Charlie van der Schoor	Charlie van der Schoor	Charlie van der Schoor		Leo van der Eijk	Leo van der Eijk	Leo van der Eijk	Leo van der Eijk	Leo van der Eijk	Leo van der Eijk	Leo van der Eijk	Leo van der Eijk	Leo van der Eijk	Leo van der Eijk	Leo van der Eijk	Leo van der Eijk	Leo van der Eijk	Leo van der Eijk
4			Arie Nap	Arie Nap														Renzo Bootsma	Renzo Bootsma
5				Kevin Schreiber															

== Sponsors ==
As a foundation Forze is completely dependent on its sponsors. Sponsors provide the team with software, materials, equipment or financial support. As of June 2026, Forze does not have a main sponsor. A list of sponsors of the team can be found on the website of Forze.
