= Southeast Asia Building (magazine) =

- Editor: An Jee Hyun
- Categories: Architecture, construction
- Frequency: Bi-monthly
- Founded: 1974; 51 years ago
- Company: Trade Link Media Pte Ltd
- Country: Singapore
- Language: English
- Website: www.tradelinkmedia.biz
- ISSN: 0218-0782

Southeast Asia Building is a trade magazine based in Singapore, started in 1974. It is published bi-monthly and covers architecture, interior design, landscape architecture, and facility management.

It caters to readers in Europe, United States, the Southeast Asian region, and in the Middle East, and provides information on current architecture projects, building news, product reviews, market trends, and industry related awards.
