= Element One =

Lawrence Technological University's hydrogen fuel cell race team

- Sport: Auto racing
- Founded: 2007
- Folded: 2010
- Country: United States

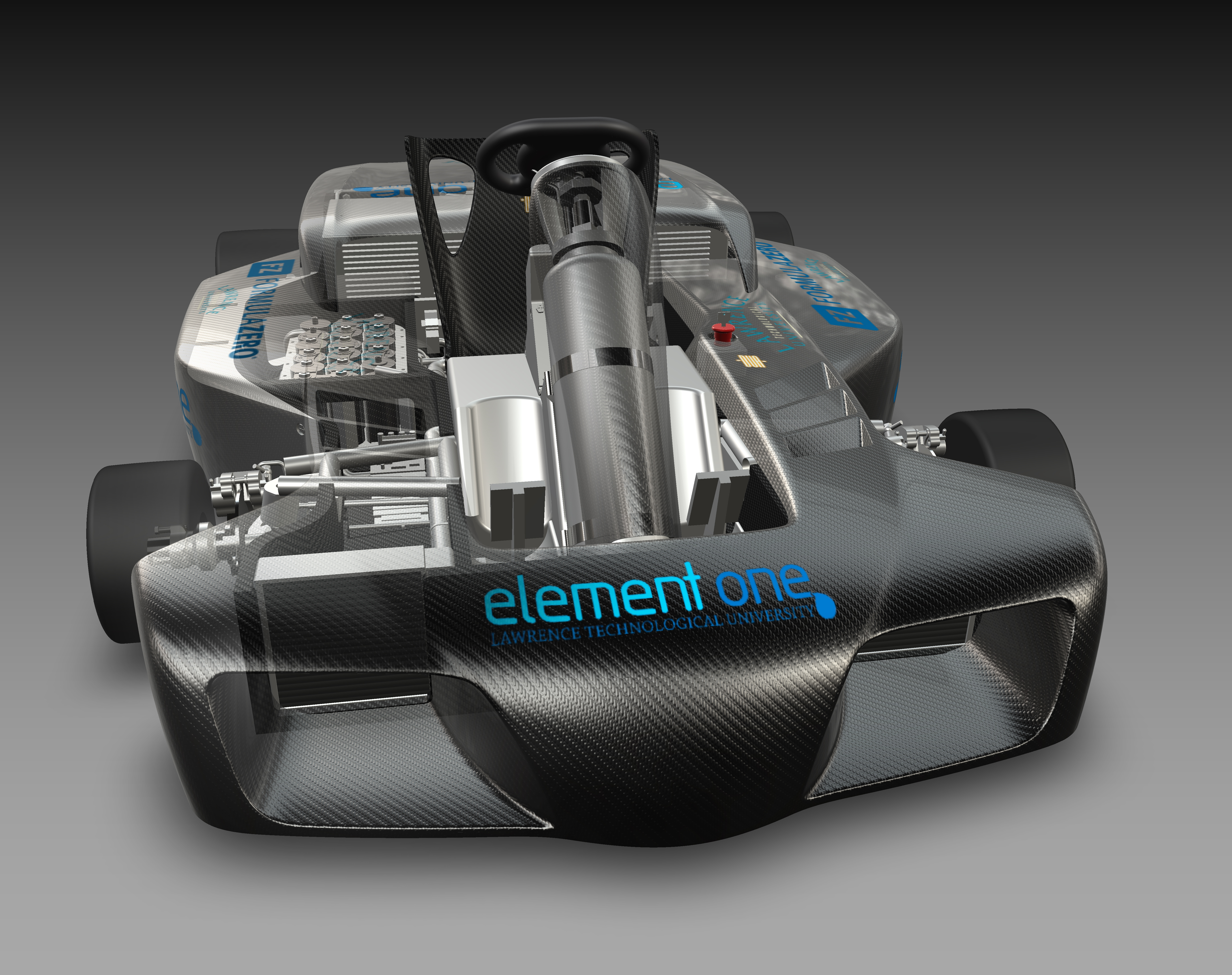
Element One vehicle rendering.

Element One is Lawrence Technological University's race team from Detroit, Michigan that competed in the 2008 Formula Zero Championship, the world's first hydrogen fuel cell race series.

== About the Team ==
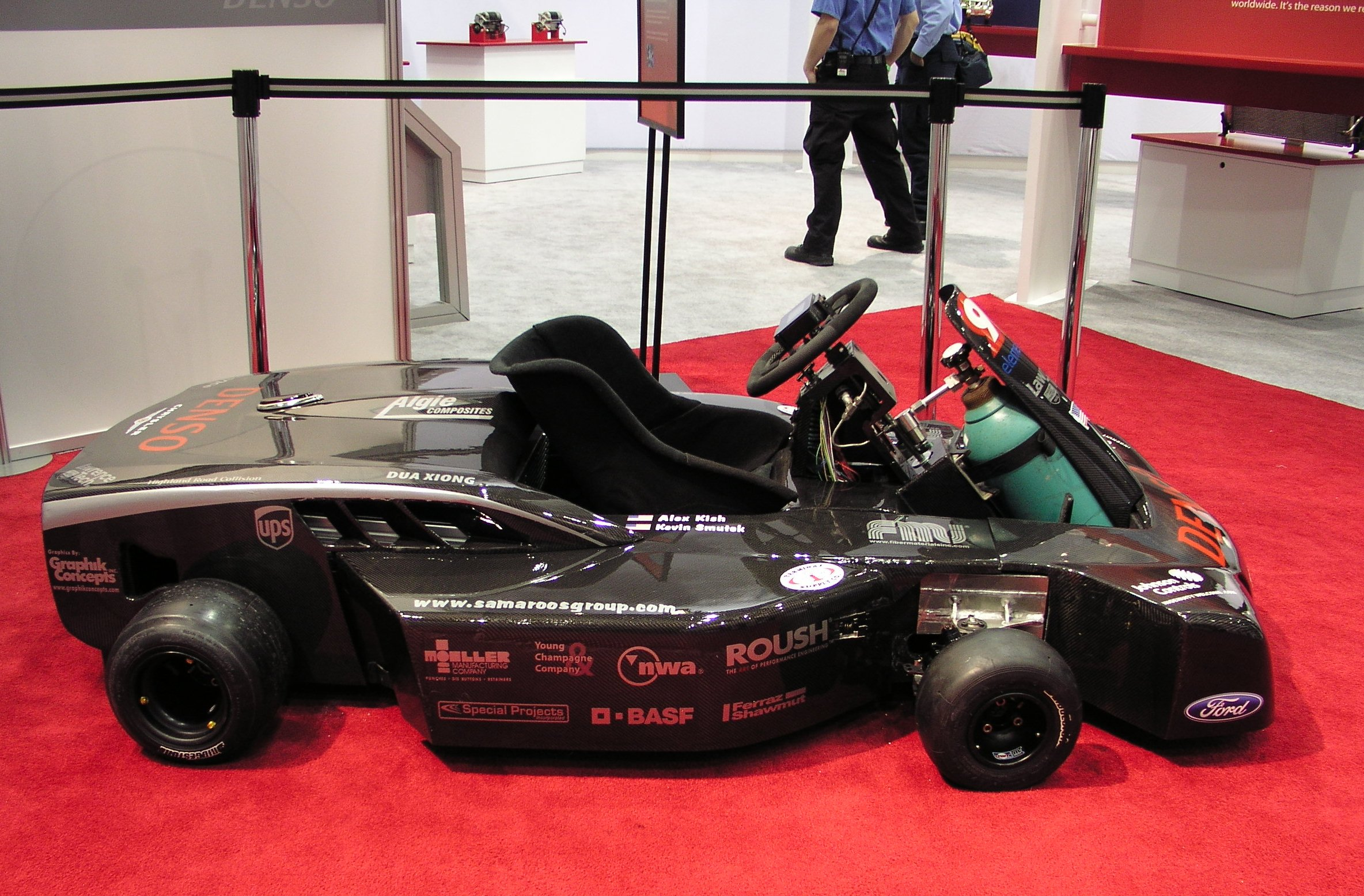
Element One race vehicle at the 2009 North American International Auto Show.

The Element One team, formed in January 2007, had over 20 members from the Colleges of Engineering and Arts and Sciences. The team officially entered the competition and submitted initial designs on June 12, 2007. The Element One team placed in the top three during their Step 3 design. The team completed their final design, Step 4 of the design competition, in March 2008. On March 14, 2008, Formula Zero announced that Element One placed 1st in the design competition and was one of six teams to receive a 'race package' from the organizers, which consists of an 8-kW Hydrogenics fuel cell power module and a hydrogen storage cylinder. Teams awarded the race package were permitted to build and race their hydrogen powered race vehicle in the 2008–2009 race series. Races were expected to be held in locations such as the UK, the Netherlands, Spain, the U.S., and several other planned locations.

The first race took place on August 22, 2008 in Rotterdam, the Netherlands. Unfortunately, Element One did not race at the event due to issues with ground clearance. Nonetheless, the team managed to get the vehicle running immediately after the race at the Formula Zero Rotterdam test facility. A video of the vehicle running can be found here. Although it did not race, the Element One vehicle was awarded 'Best Vehicle Design' by Bright Magazine during the 2008 Formula Zero awards ceremony in Rotterdam. The team was restructured once the members returned from Rotterdam. The vehicle also underwent several changes to improve performance. In January 2009, the new vehicle was featured at the 2009 North American International Auto Show in Detroit, Michigan. On March 31 and April 1, 2009, Element One performed vehicle demonstrations to the public and to attendees of the National Hydrogen Association conference in South Carolina. The team received a very positive reception from both the fuel cell industry and the public. The vehicle was also the subject of attention for local reporters and TV stations. Following the vehicle demonstrations in South Carolina, Element One decided to design and build a completely new vehicle for the 2010 Formula SAE Hybrid competition. The new vehicle will not use a hydrogen fuel cell but instead, will use a combustion engine as a generator, as well as a battery pack for the powerplant of the vehicle. The 2009 Element One vehicle is still being utilized as a demonstration vehicle by Lawrence Tech University and even made another appearance at the North American International Auto Show in January, 2010. Formula Zero continues to host races throughout Europe with the European teams in the hope of developing its own race class. Element One's progress can be followed on their Element One Youtube Channel, where updates are posted on a regular basis.

== The Vehicle ==
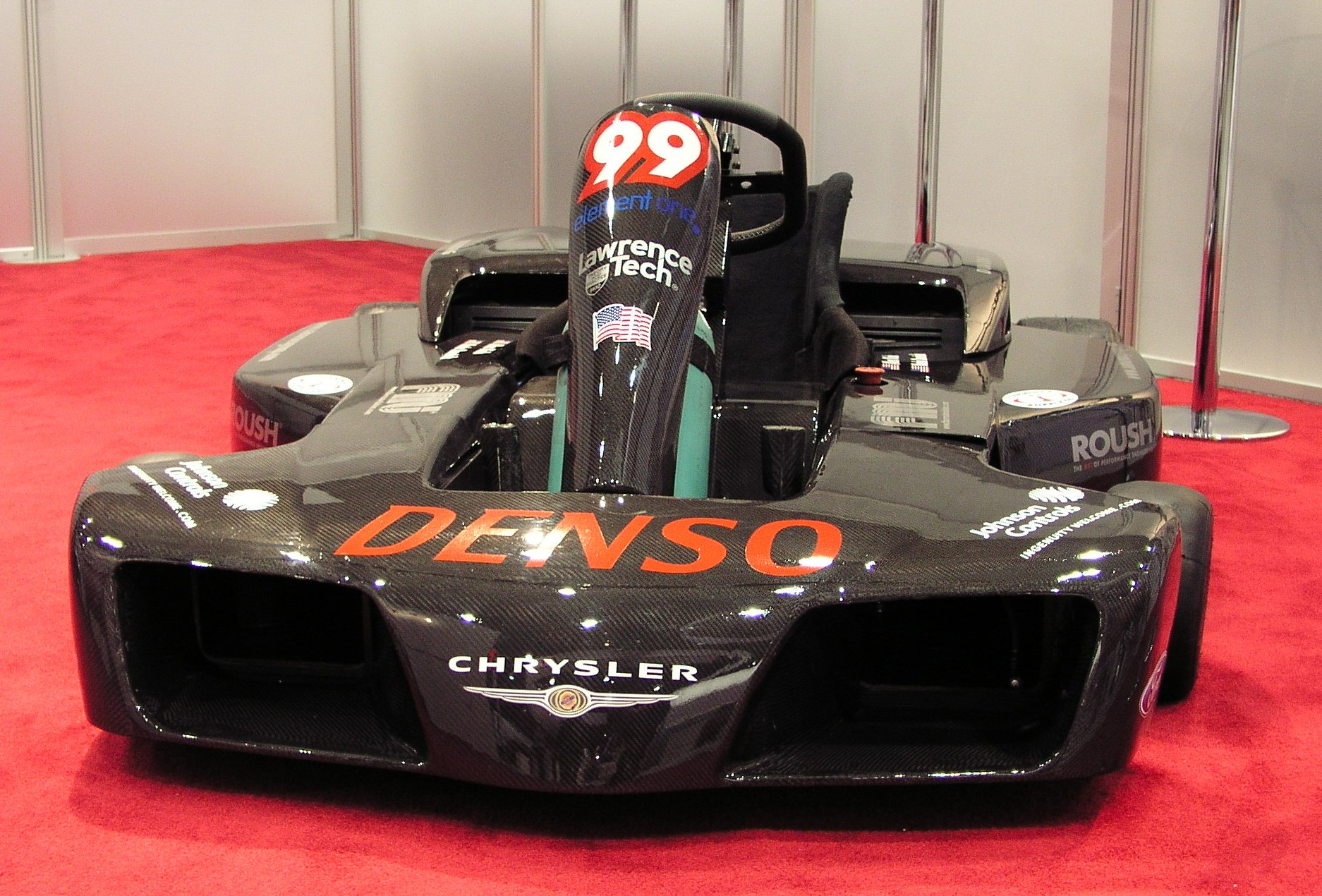
Element One is the lightest vehicle in the Formula Zero race series.

Element One was the lightest vehicle in the Formula Zero race series, weighing in at approximately 500 lbs. The vehicle's chassis was constructed entirely from carbon fiber by Lawrence Tech students in Columbus, Ohio, making Element One the first fuel cell vehicle of its kind. The vehicle also featured the most powerful motor in the competition with regenerative braking capabilities. Top speed of the vehicle is approximately 70 mph. Power is produced from the vehicle's 8 kilowatt Hydrogenics fuel cell module and energy is stored via ultracapacitors. All communications between the motor controller, fuel cell and ultracapacitors were programmed by Lawrence Tech students. The advanced technologies and engineering put into the Element One vehicle made this a very ambitious project done by university students.

== Team founders ==
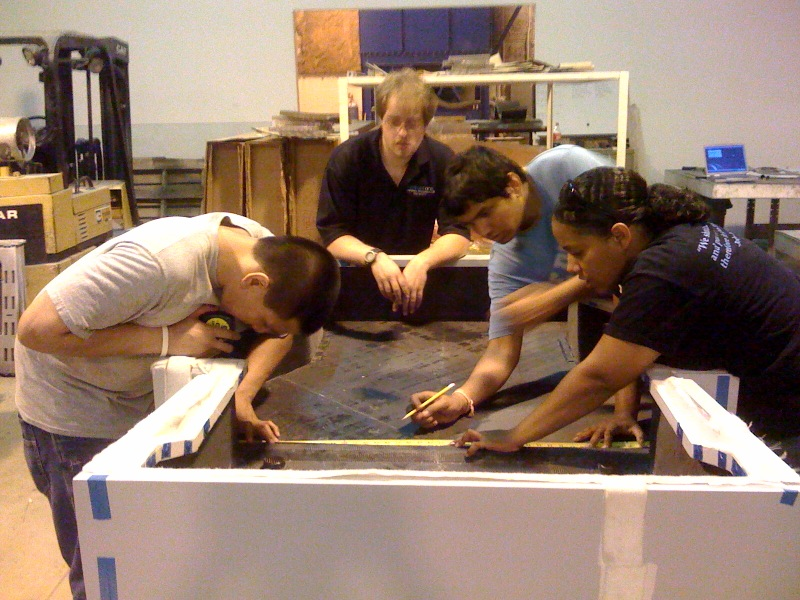
Carbon fiber chassis construction in Columbus, Ohio.

Element One, originally called 'Project Blue Devil', was founded in January 2007 by four Lawrence Tech engineering students, Ivan Dimitrov, Camille Robbins, Patrick Morin and Mike Samaroo. These four students were passionate about renewable energy and wanted to build a zero emissions vehicle. After almost three years of searching for the right opportunity to build a vehicle, Mike Samaroo met the Formula Zero organization in the Netherlands in December 2006 while on a study-abroad program in Germany. A month later, the four students regrouped and with the support of their faculty advisor, their proposal to form a Lawrence Tech Formula Zero team was approved by the university. The project was founded by the following students and faculty advisor.

Ivan D
Patrick Morin
Camille Robbins
Mike Samaroo

Faculty Advisor: Dr. Robert Fletcher

== 2007–2008 Team Leaders and Advisors ==
The 2007–08 Element One team consisted of the following sub-teams:

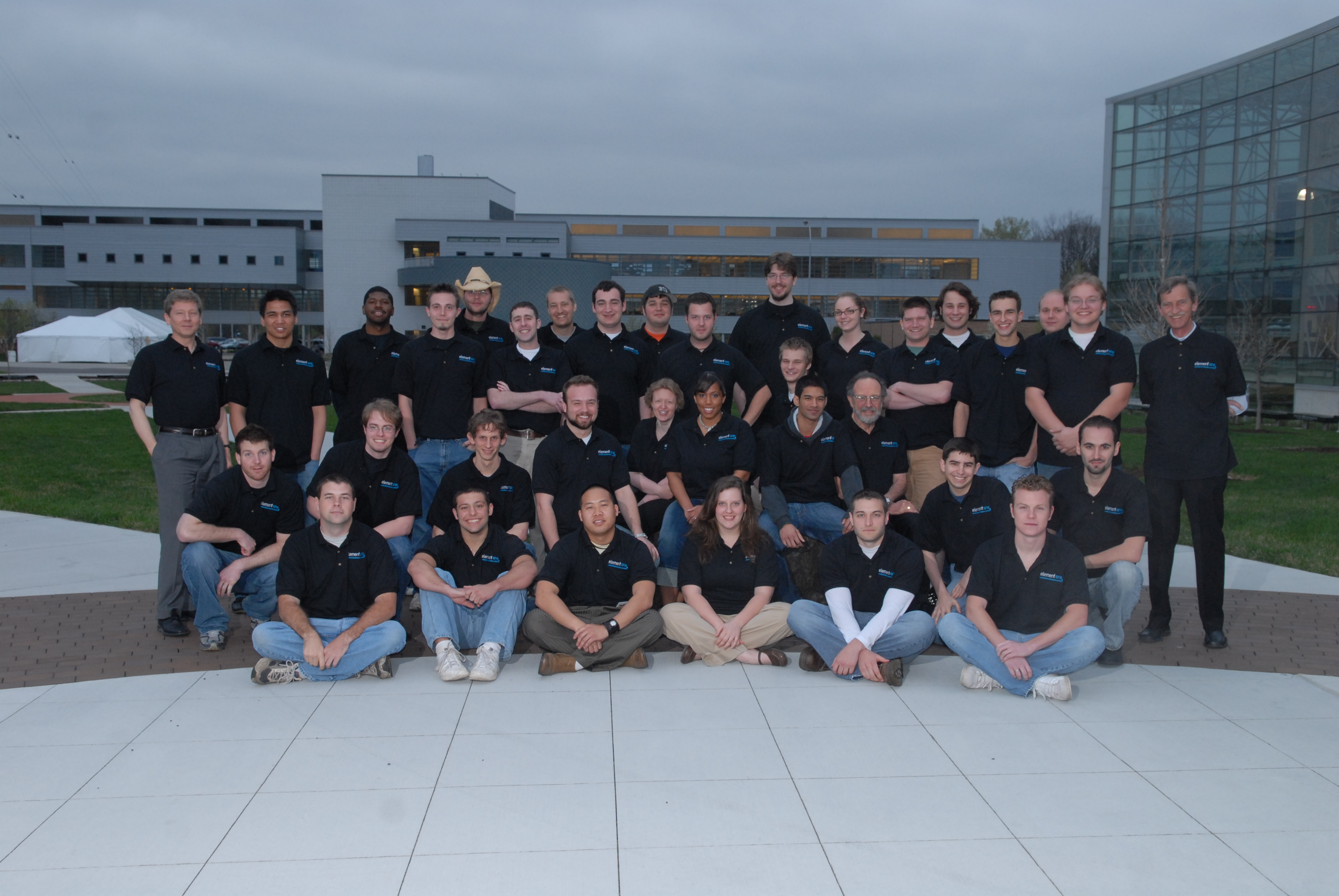
2007–08 Element One members.

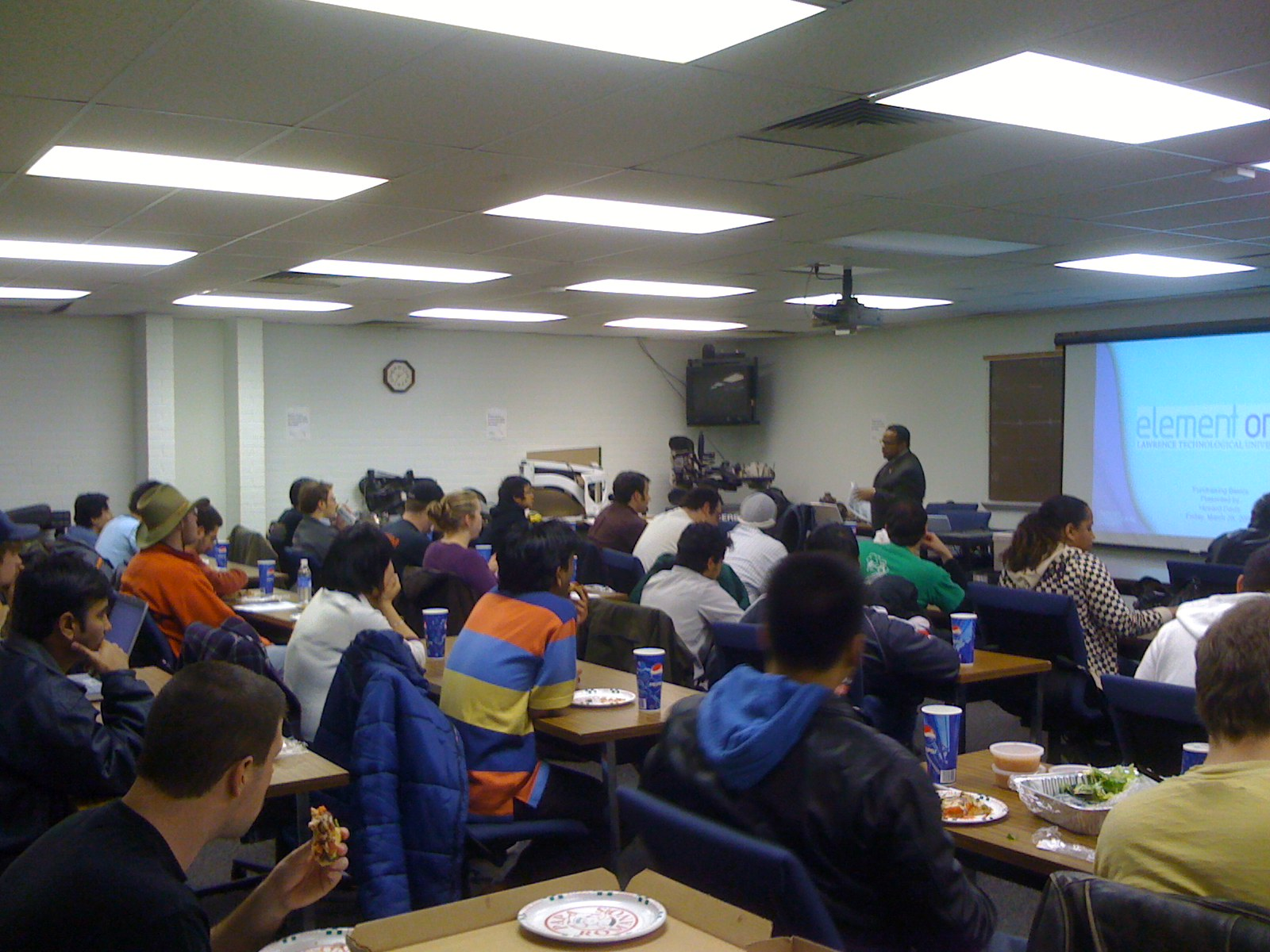
Members learn how to fund raise during a mass team meeting.

Sub-Team	Team Leader
Body and Chassis	Camille Robbins
Electrical Systems	Adrian Snyder
Hydrogen and Fuel Cell Systems	Mike Samaroo
Public Relations and Finance	Chris Miller*
Safety	Robert House
Body & Chassis – Fab	Saranyan Saalai
Vehicle Dynamics	Adam Flaster*

- Former PR and Finance Leaders: Patrick Morin (January 2007 – October 2007), Joe Brandt (October 2007 – March 2008)
- Former Vehicle Dynamics Leader: Ivan D (January 2007 – August 2007)

Faculty Advisors
Frank de Hesselle
Dr. Robert Farrah
Dr. Robert Fletcher

== 2008 Element One Rotterdam Pit Crew ==
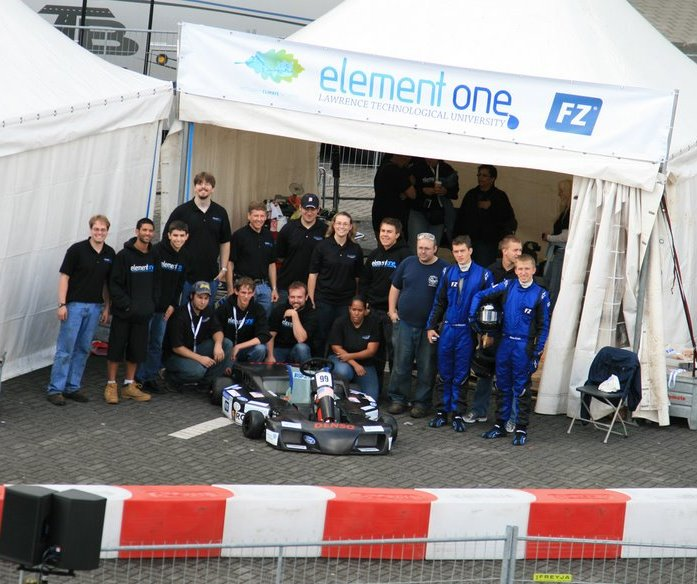
The Element One Pit Crew on race day, August 2008, Rotterdam.

The Rotterdam Pit Crew was a selected group of Element One members who traveled to the first race of the Formula Zero Championship in Rotterdam, the Netherlands in August 2008 to ensure all systems of the vehicle were fully functional and operational during race events. The Pit Crew worked hard to complete assembly of the vehicle before the first race. Unfortunately, it was the vehicle's ground clearance that prevented these engineers from getting their kart on the track. Nonetheless, the team managed to get the vehicle assembled in five days (a feat that usually takes months to achieve) and performed a vehicle test run at the Formula Zero Rotterdam Facility the evening of the first race. The names of these engineers are listed in the table below.

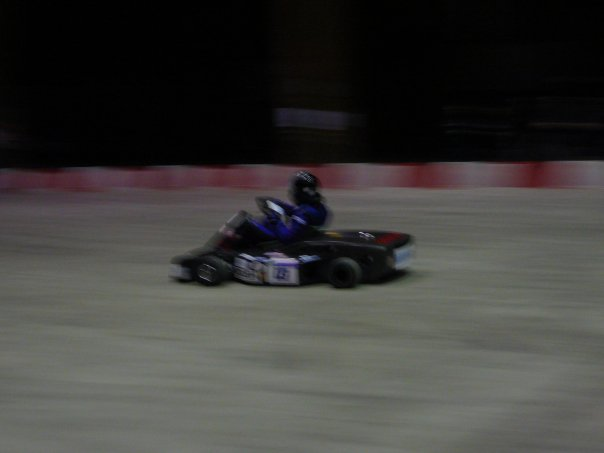
Vehicle test run at Formula Zero Rotterdam facility.

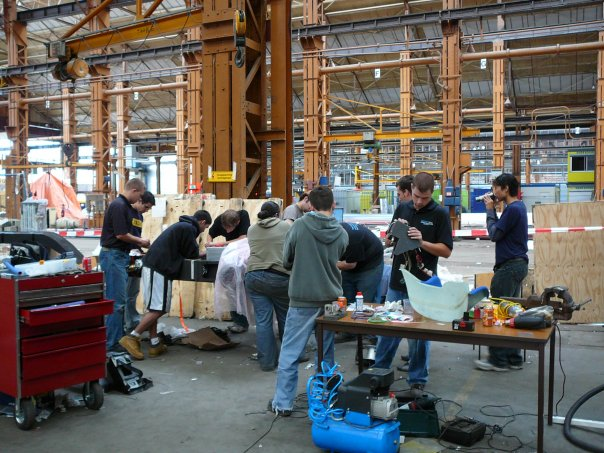
Element One Pit Crew assembling vehicle at the FZ Rotterdam Facility.

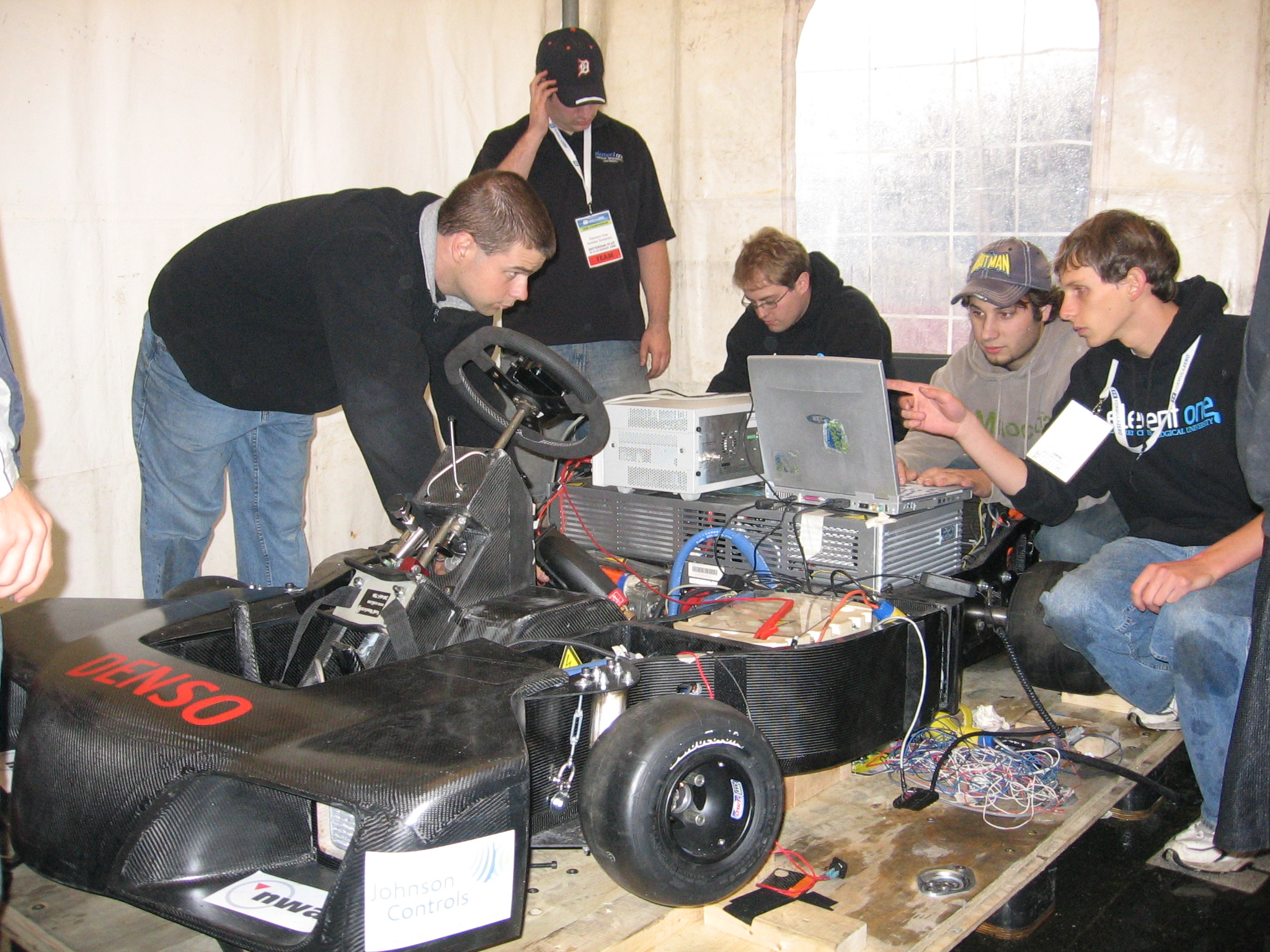
Element One Pit Crew makes last minute adjustments to the vehicle.

Pit Crew Member	Responsibility
Camille Robbins	Body & Chassis
Robert House	Safety Officer/Body & Chassis
Adrian Snyder	Electrical Systems – Electrical Group Lead 2007–2009
Robert Bitel	Electrical Systems – Electronic Controls
Andrew Schembri	Electrical Systems – HV System Architecture
Jon Graff	Electrical Systems – Electronic Controls
Dan Witting	Electrical Systems – Electrical Group Lead 2009–2010
Mike Samaroo	Hydrogen & Fuel Cell Systems
Robert Jackson	Hydrogen & Fuel Cell Systems
Ian Williams	Hydrogen & Fuel Cell Systems
Jeff Rayburn	Hydrogen & Fuel Cell Systems
Adam Flaster	Vehicle Dynamics
Ben Roberts	Vehicle Dynamics
Alex Popovich	Component Layout
Alex Kish	Driver
Kevin Smutek	Driver
Andrew Didorosi	Public Relations Officer
Dr. Robert Fletcher	Faculty Advisor

== Awards ==
- 1st Place in 2007–08 Formula Zero Design Competition
- Bright Magazine 'Best Vehicle Design' Award (voted by readers of the magazine)

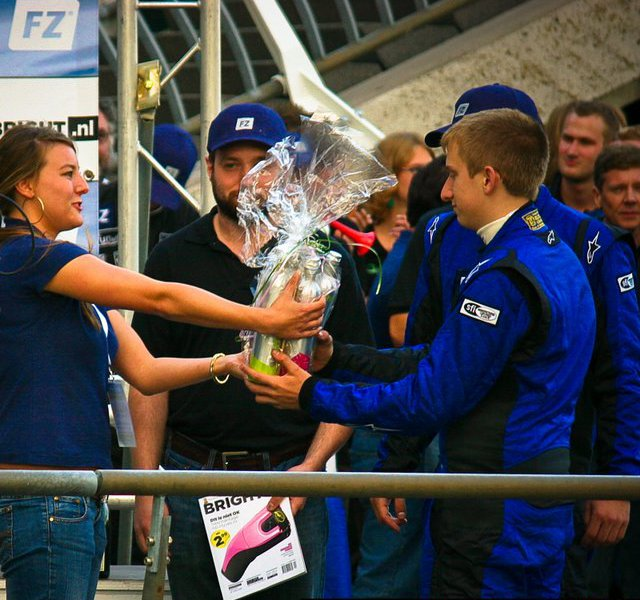
Element One team receives the Bright Magazine Best Vehicle Design award at the 2008 Formula Zero awards ceremony in Rotterdam.

== Publicity ==
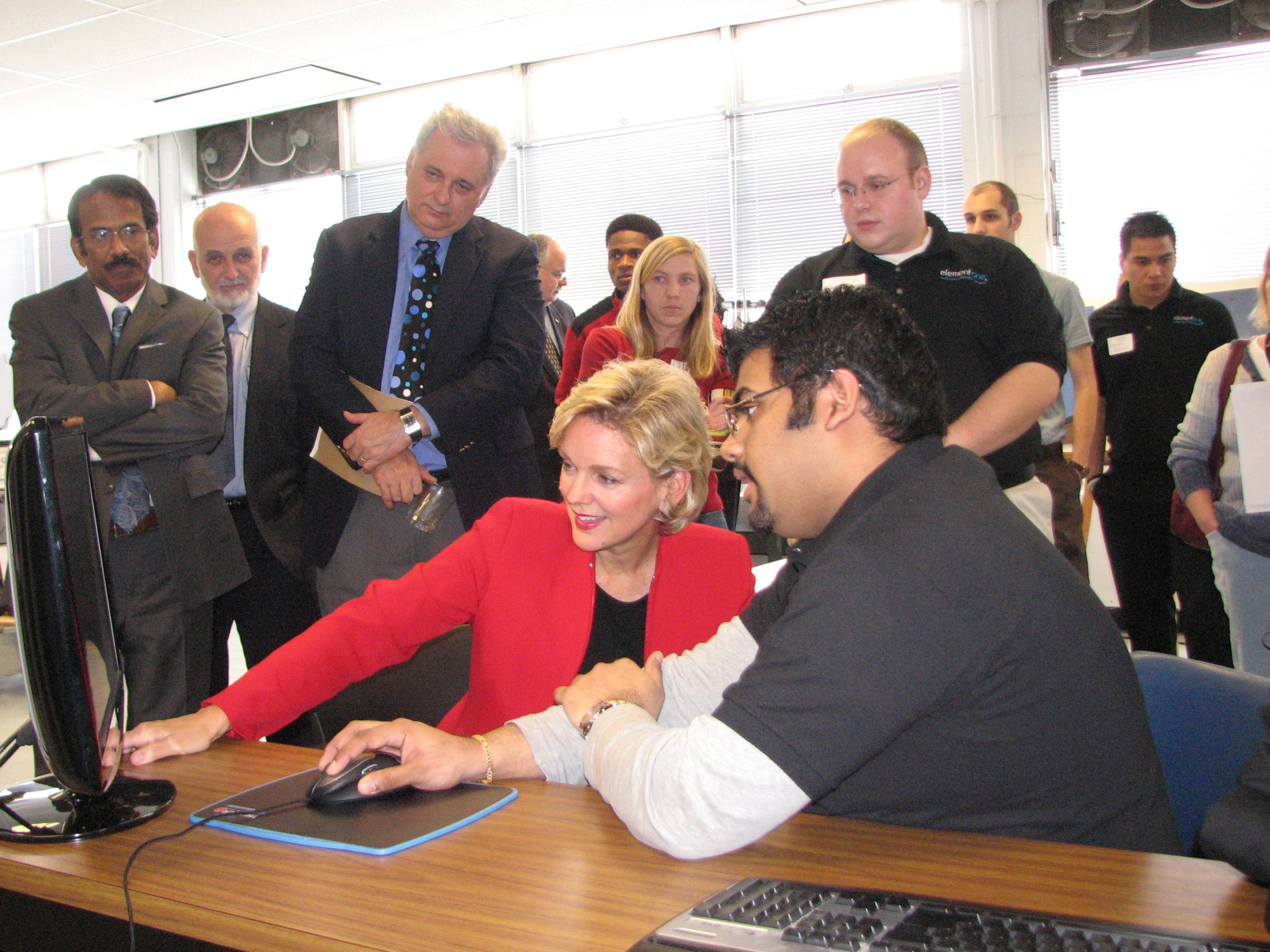
Governor Jennifer Granholm learns about the Element One vehicle through one of the team members.

The Element One team has traveled to states and countries such as Ohio, Florida, Nevada, California, the Netherlands, the United Arab Emirates, Canada, and Trinidad & Tobago to generate excitement about sustainable transportation and to change the way people think about energy. The project has gained the support and encouragement of many influential individuals, including former governor of Michigan, Jennifer Granholm, who visited Lawrence Tech in February 2008 to learn about the design of the vehicle. Given the uniqueness of the project, the team was featured in the September 2008 issue of Popular Science Magazine. The team's accomplishments were also highlighted by the Detroit Free Press, WJR Radio, the Gulf News, Fuel Cell Today, AutoblogGreen, Detroit Auto Scene, and many more.

== 2008–2009 Team Leaders and Advisors ==
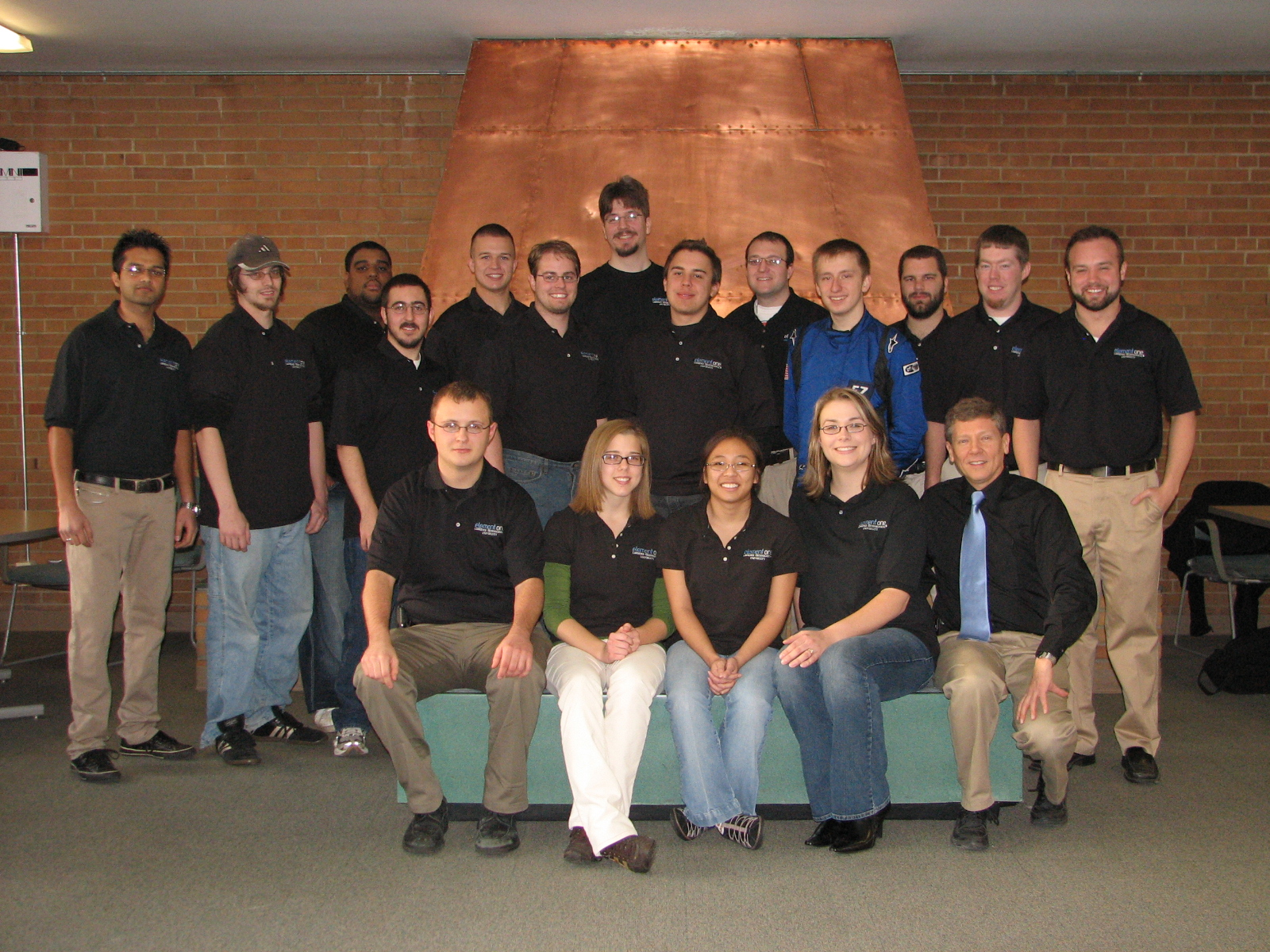
2008–2009 Element One team members.

In preparation of the next race, the team has undergone a new leadership structure.

Sub-Team	Team Leader
Electrical Systems	Daniel Witting*
Hydrogen and Fuel Cell Systems	Ian Williams
Public Relations and Finance	Samantha Burgess*
Body & Chassis	Saranyan Saalai
Safety	NA
Vehicle Dynamics	Nicholas Vella*
CAD & Documentation	Alex Popovich
Team Manager: Patrick McInally*

- Former Electrical Systems Leader: Stephanie Frederick
- Former Vehicle Dynamics Leader: Patrick McInally
- Former Public Relations and Finance Leader: Andrew Didorosi
- Former Body and Chassis Leader: Brian Holychuk
- Former Team Manager: Adrian Snyder

Faculty Advisors
Dr. Robert Farrah
Dr. Robert Fletcher

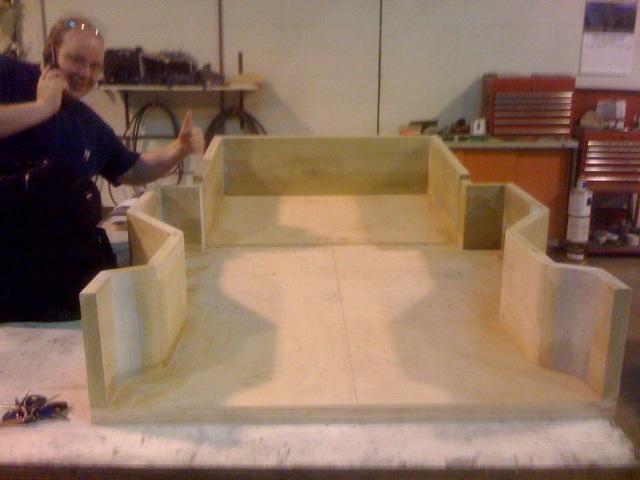
Element One member prepares chassis molds prior to carbon fiber lay-up process.

== 2009 to Present: Formula Hybrid Competition ==
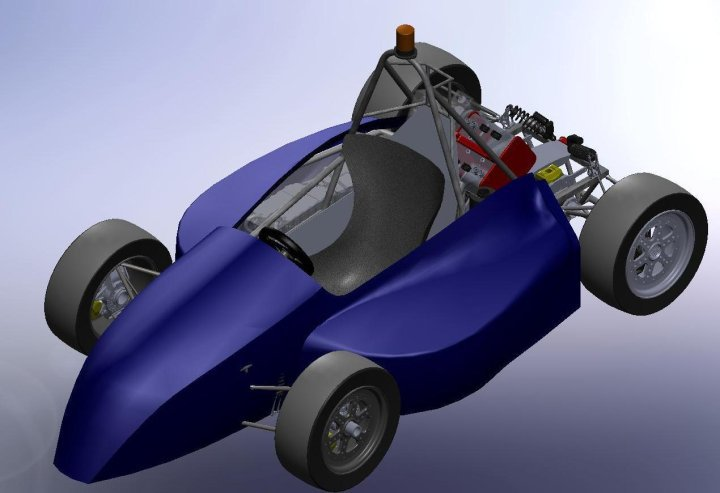
2010 LTU FSAEH Vehicle Rendering.

With the Formula Zero Competition coming to a foreseeable end, the remaining members of the team started out to find a new alternative energy motorsports competition. After much review of the available venues, the team decided upon the SAE sanctioned Formula Hybrid Competition. In this new venue, the focus of design turned away from fuel-cell power series hybrids, to internal combustion parallel and series hybrids exclusively. With all previous focus being on series-hybrid architecture, the team continued onward into the 2010 competition year with an independent rear wheel drive vehicle power by two DC motors. Technical details included:

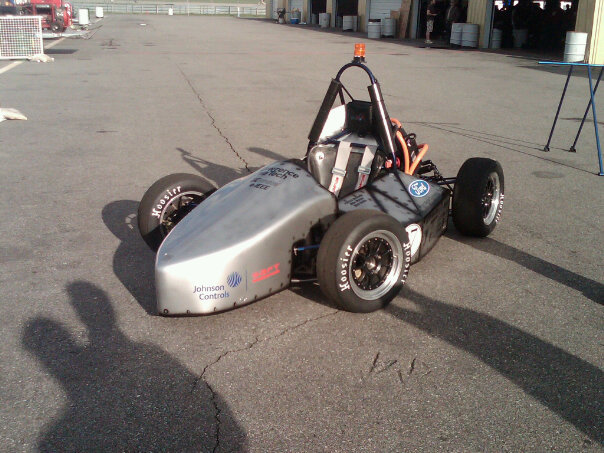
2010 LTU FSAEH Competition Vehicle

== 2010 Vehicle Specifications ==
Powertrain

- 2 – 16.7 kW cont. DCPM Motors
- 96 – Lithium Ion Cells (provided by Johnson Controls-SAFT)
  - 2.25kWh Capacity (Nominal)
  - 30 kW (75 kW pk) Power Rating
- 7 kW Internal Combustion Engine Generator
  - Honda CRF250R Drive
  - 16.7 kW DCPM Generator
  - 7 kW DCDC Converter

Electronic Controls

- 4 – HCS12 Processor Modules
- High Speed CAN Interface
- OLED GUI Steering Wheel

Mechanical Systems

- Tube Steel Chassis
- Independent Rear Wheel Drivetrain
- Carbon Fiber Body and Seat
- 620 lb (excluding driver)

== Past and Current Leaders ==
Designation	Team Leader
Team Lead	Patrick McInally
Electrical Systems and Powertrain	Dan Witting
Mechanical Systems	Nick Vella
CAD/Documentation	Alex Popovich
Lead Programmer	Alex Campbell

Faculty Advisors
Ben Sweet
Dr. Robert Fletcher

== Past and Current Sponsors of Element One Racing/Blue Devil Motorsports ==
Listed in chronological addition of contribution:

- Johnson Controls, Inc
- DENSO
- Ford Motor Company
- Chrysler
- Castlepoint
- Samaroo's Group
- ROUSH
- Algie Composites
- Northwest Airlines
- Special Projects Incorporated
- Dua Xiong
- Terminal Supply Co.
- Graphik Concepts
- Ferraz Shawmut
- Fiber Materials, Inc
- HJC Helmets
- UPS
- Young & Champagne Company
- Moeller Manufacturing Company, Inc
- Highland Road Collision, Inc
- Tyco Electronics
- People's Trust Credit Union
