= L.P. Cookingham Institute of Urban Affairs =

L.P. Cookingham Institute of Urban Affairs used to be known as the Department of Public Affairs at the University of Missouri-Kansas City’s Bloch School of Business and Public Administration.

Named after Laurie Perry Cookingham, the institute promotes community building and development as a means to contribute to urban area revitalization through scholarship, practice and community engagement in the Kansas City area.

The U.S. Peace Corps have formed a partnership with the institute to strengthen the university's commitment to bring the expertise within the university and into the community.
