= University of Kansas School of Engineering =

Engineering school in Lawrence, Kansas, US

Coordinates: 38°57′29″N 95°15′13″W

- Type: Public
- Established: 1891
- Dean: Mary Rezac
- Undergraduates: 2,812
- Postgraduates: 523
- Location: Lawrence, Kansas, U.S.
- Colors: Crimson and blue
- Website: www.engr.ku.edu

The University of Kansas School of Engineering, founded in 1891 is the oldest Engineering School in the State of Kansas, although engineering degrees were awarded as early as 1873. It is an ABET accredited, public engineering school located on the main campus of the University of Kansas in Lawrence, Kansas.

== Notable alumni ==
- Linda Cook (PE 1981), executive director of Shell Gas & Power and a member of the Shell Executive Committee.
- Joseph Engle (AE 1955), astronaut and NASA space shuttle commander.
- Robert Eaton (ME 1963), retired DaimlerChrysler AG Chairman.
- Brian McClendon (BSEE 1986), VP of Engineering at Google.
- Wayne Meyer (BSEE 1946), Rear Admiral in United States Navy, director of the AEGIS Shipbuilding Project.
- Lou Montulli, co-founder of Netscape and author of the Lynx web browser.
- Alan Mulally (BS/MS AE), President and CEO of Ford Motor Company
- Douglas Shane (BS 1982), director of flight operations for SpaceShipOne, which made the first privately funded human spaceflight.
- Charles Spahr (1934), former CEO of Standard Oil of Ohio.
- Daniel A. Vallero (MS CE 1996), Adjunct Faculty Duke University.

== See also ==
- Kansas State University College of Engineering
