= Henry W. Bloch School of Management =

Business school at University of Missouri, Kansas City in Missouri, United States

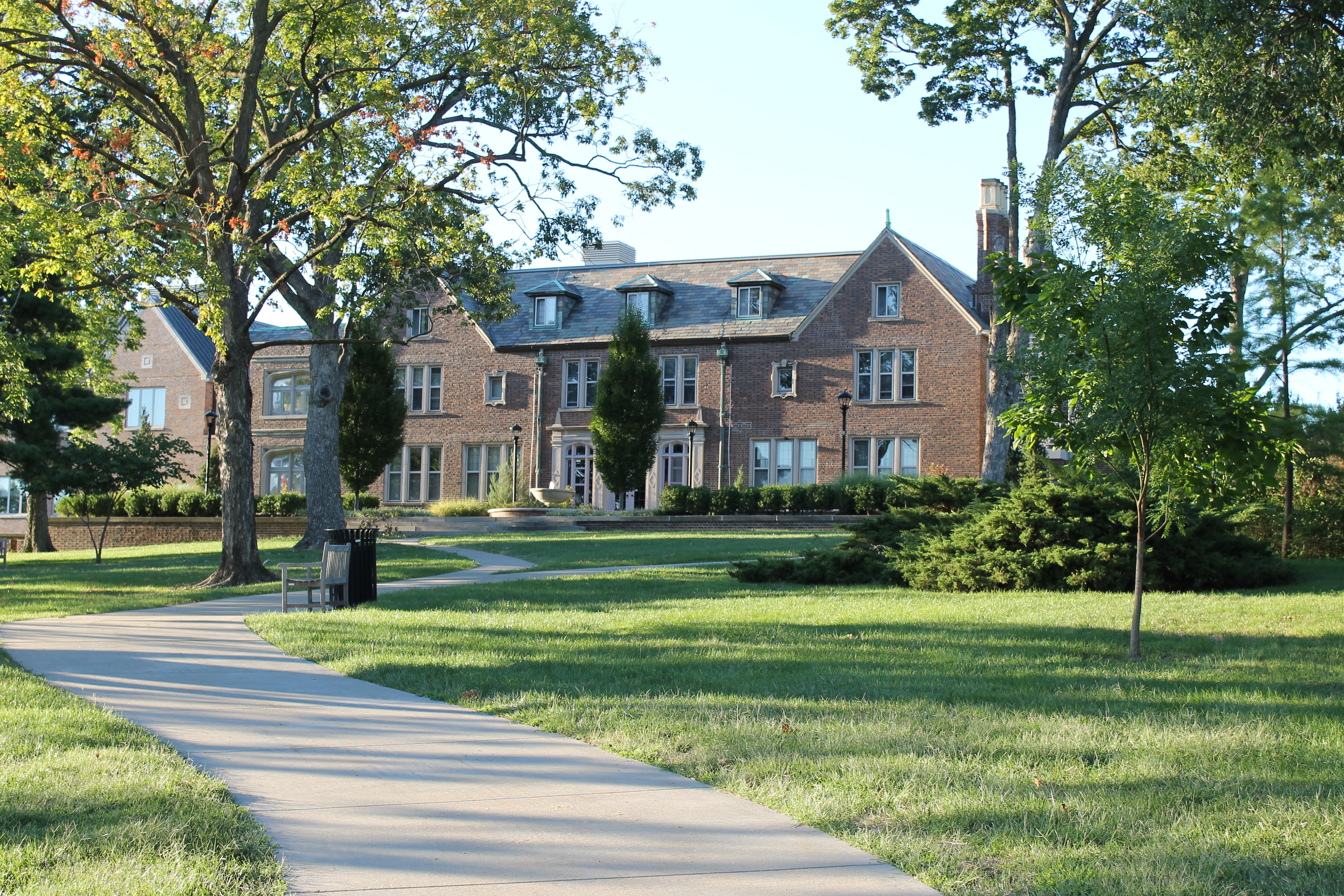
- Type: Public
- Established: 1952
- Endowment: US$24 million
- Dean: Brian Klaas, PhD
- Academic staff: 45
- Students: 1558
- Location: Kansas City, Missouri, USA; 39°01′59″N 94°34′52″W
- Campus: Urban
- Website: bloch.umkc.edu

Henry W. Bloch School of Management (formerly known as Henry W. Bloch School of Business and Public Administration) is an AACSB accredited business school founded in 1952 at the University of Missouri-Kansas City in Kansas City, Missouri. It offers undergraduate and graduate degrees in Business, Accounting and Public Administration. It is named after Alumnus Henry W. Bloch, founder of H&R Block. The Bloch School also offers NASPAA accredited degrees in Public administration.

== Rankings ==
The school's Executive MBA was ranked once by Financial Times and the Master of Public Administration (MPA) in Non-Profit Management is ranked among the top 25 of the United States by U.S. News & World Report.

The School is also home to a number of centers and institutes such as the L.P. Cookingham Institute of Urban Affairs and the Midwest Center for Nonprofit Leadership.

In 2025, U.S. News ranked the UMKC Bloch School of Management as a "best business school" and received very high rankings for its MBA. Out of 239 business schools in the entire country, the part-time Masters of Business Administration (MBA) was ranked #105.

2014-2015 Ranking Controversy

In 2012, the Journal of Product Innovation Management published a study that ranked the school number 1 in the world for research in innovation management. However, the methodology of the study and the independence of its authors was questioned. In March 2015, the journal published an "expression of concern" regarding the study.

After a 2014 investigation led by the Kansas City Star, and a subsequent audit by an international accounting firm, the school was found to have knowingly falsified its ranking to the Princeton Review. The UMKC business school lost 4 years of rankings from the Princeton Review for falsifying data.

== See also ==
- University of Missouri–Kansas City
- Missouri University System
- UMKC Law School
- UMKC School of Medicine
