= List of development aid agencies =

This is a list of development aid agencies which provide regional and international development aid or assistance, divided between national (mainly OECD countries) and international organizations. Agencies of numerous development cooperation partners from emerging countries such as India, Middle Eastern countries, Mexico, South Africa, Southeast Asian countries, and so on, are not included.

== International ==
- Argentina - White Helmets Commission (Comisión Cascos Blancos)
- Australia - Department of Foreign Affairs and Trade (Development Cooperation Division), formerly AusAID
- Austria - Austrian Development Agency - ADA The Austrian Development Cooperation, Austria Wirtschaftsservice Gesellschaft (aws)
- Azerbaijan - Azerbaijan International Development Agency
- Belgium - Ministry of Foreign Affairs, Foreign Trade and Development: Belgian Policy Plan for Development Cooperation Belgian Development Agency - Enabel
- Brazil - Agência Brasileira de Cooperação
- Canada - Canadian International Development Agency (absorbed into Foreign Affairs, Trade, and Development Canada, now known as Global Affairs Canada), the International Development Research Centre (IDRC) and the Canadian Executive Services Organization (CESO|SACO)
- Chile - Agencia de Cooperación Internacional de Chile (AGCI)
- China - China International Development Cooperation Agency (CIDCA)
  - formerly, Department of Foreign Aid of the Ministry of Commerce (MOFCOM)
- Czech Republic - Czech Development Agency (CzDA)
- Denmark - Danish International Development Agency (DANIDA)
- Egypt - Egyptian Agency for Partnership for Development
- European Union - Directorate-General for International Partnerships
- Finland - Department for International Development Cooperation (FINNIDA)
- France - Expertise France, Department for International Cooperation and French Development Agency (AFD)
- Germany - Federal Ministry for Economic Cooperation and Development, Kreditanstalt für Wiederaufbau (KfW), and Deutsche Gesellschaft für Internationale Zusammenarbeit (GIZ)
- Greece - Ministry of Foreign Affairs
- India- Indian Agency for Partnership in Development (IAPD), Development Partnership Administration, Indian Technical and Economical Cooperation (Since 1964)ITEC :Indian Technical and Economic Cooperation
- Indonesia - Indonesian Aid (Lembaga Dana Kerja Sama Pembangunan Internasional, LDKPI)
- Iran - Organization for Investment, Economic, and Technical Assistance of Iran
- Ireland - Irish Aid
- Israel - Ministry of Foreign Affairs: MASHAV - Israel's Agency for International Development Cooperation
- Italy - Ministry of Foreign Affairs: Italian Development Cooperation Programme
- Japan - Japan International Cooperation Agency (JICA), and Japan Bank for International Cooperation (JBIC)
- Korea - Korea International Cooperation Agency (KOICA), Export-Import Bank of Korea (KEXIM)
- Kuwait - Kuwait Fund for Arab Economic Development
- Liechtenstein - Liechtensteinische Entwicklungsdienst
- Luxembourg - Lux-Development
- Mexico - AMEXCID
- New Zealand - Ministry of Foreign affairs and Trade (MFAT) previously known as New Zealand Agency for International Development (NZAid)
- Netherlands - Ministry of Development Cooperation (has its own minister but is a part of the Ministry of Foreign Affairs) and The Netherlands Foreign Trade and Development Agency(NFTDA)
- Norway - Ministry of Foreign Affairs: International Development Program and Norwegian Agency for Development Cooperation (NORAD)
- Poland - Ministry of Foreign Affairs: The Development Co-operation Department
- Portugal - Camões - Instituto da Cooperação e da Língua
- Pakistan - Pakistan Technical Assistance Programme
- Palestine - Palestinian International Cooperation Agency (PICA)
- Republic of China (Taiwan) - International Cooperation and Development Fund(ICDF)
- Romania - Assistance for Development (AOD)
- Russia - Federal Agency for the Commonwealth of Independent States, Compatriots Living Abroad and International Humanitarian Cooperation (Rossotrudnichestvo)
- Saudi Arabia - Saudi Fund for Development (SFD)
- Slovakia - Slovak Aid
- Spain - Spanish Agency for International Development Cooperation (AECID)
- South Africa - Development Bank of Southern Africa (DBSA)
- Sweden - Swedish International Development Cooperation Agency (Sida)
- Switzerland - Swiss Agency for Development and Cooperation (SDC), Helvetas
- Taiwan - International Cooperation and Development Fund (Taiwan ICDF)
- Thailand - Thailand International Cooperation Agency (TICA)
- Turkey - Turkish Cooperation and Coordination Agency (TİKA)
- United Kingdom - Foreign, Commonwealth and Development Office (FCDO)
- United States - United States Agency for International Development (USAID), the Inter-American Foundation (IAF), Millennium Challenge Corporation (MCC), and the African Development Foundation (ADF)

== Multilateral organizations ==
- African Development Bank (AfDB)
- Asian Development Bank (ADB)
- Asian Infrastructure Investment Bank (AIIB)
- Black Sea Trade and Development Bank
- Caribbean Development Bank (CDB)
- Colombo Plan (CP)
- Development Bank of Latin America and the Caribbean (CAF)
- Eurasian Development Bank
- European Bank for Reconstruction and Development (EBRD)
- European Investment Bank
- Food and Agriculture Organization of the United Nations (FAO)
- Inter-American Development Bank (IADB)
- International Bank for Reconstruction and Development (IBRD; part of the World Bank Group)
- International Development Law Organization (IDLO)
- International Fund for Agricultural Development (IFAD)
- International Labour Organization (ILO)
- International Monetary Fund (IMF)
- International Organization for Migration (IOM)
- International Red Cross (ICRC AND IFRC)
- Islamic Development Bank (IDB)
- Multilateral Investment Guarantee Agency (MIGA, part of the World Bank Group)
- Organisation for Economic Co-operation and Development (OECD)
- Technical Centre for Agricultural and Rural Cooperation ACP-EU (CTA)
- United Nations (UN)
- United Nations Children's Fund (UNICEF)
- United Nations Conference on Trade and Development (UNCTAD)
- United Nations Development Programme (UNDP)
- United Nations Population Fund (UNFPA)
- United Nations Environment Programme (UNEP)
- United Nations High Commissioner for Refugees (UNHCR)
- United Nations Industrial Development Organization (UNIDO)
- United Nations Office for the Coordination of Humanitarian Affairs (OCHA)
- World Bank Group
- World Food Programme (WFP)
- World Health Organization (WHO)
- World Trade Organization (WTO)

== Non-governmental organisations ==
- ACTED
- ActionAid
- Adventist Development and Relief Agency
- Afghan German Management College
- AID Kenya Foundation
- AIDS No More
- AKDN
- All We Can - Methodist relief and development
- Artists for Charity
- BRAC
- Business Council for Peace
- Camfed
- CARE (relief agency), originally "Cooperative for American Remittances to Europe", and later "Cooperative for Assistance and Relief Everywhere"
- Catholic Relief Services
- Centre for Safety and Development
- Center for Victims of Torture
- Centre for Values in Leadership
- Christian Aid
- Agency of International Cooperation for Development
- Compassion International
- Dubai Cares
- European Sustainable Development Organisation (ESDO)
- Five Talents
- Giving Children Hope
- Habitat for Humanity International
- Heifer International
- Helpage International
- HOPE International Development Agency
- Humanity and Hope United Foundation
- ICLEI - Local Governments for Sustainability
- International Development Enterprises
- International Fertilizer Development Center
- International Medical Relief
- International Women's Development Agency
- International Youth Foundation
- Jugend Eine Welt
- Lamia Afghan Foundation
- Light for the World
- Malteser International
- Medair
- Medecins sans Frontieres
- Medical Teams International
- Mennonite Central Committee
- Mercy Corps
- Mercy Relief
- Oxfam
- Peace Direct
- People in Need
- Plan International
- Rapid Response
- Samaritan's Purse
- Save the Children
- Seva Foundation
- SNV Netherlands Development Organisation
- Street Kids International
- Sustainable Sanitation Alliance
- Swissaid
- Teach For All
- TMSS
- Tearfund
- Terra Tech
- Trickle Up
- United Purpose
- WaterAid
- Women in Europe for a Common Future (WECF)
- World Accord - International Development Agency
- World Renew
- World Vision International

== Web portals ==
- Global South Development Magazine: magazine dedicated to international development
- Development Business
- DevelopmentAid
- Devex: jobs, news and business advice
- ReliefWeb

== See also ==
- List of national development banks
