= Enabel =

Belgian agency

- Headquarters: Marollen, Brussels
- Director-general: Jean Van Wetter
- Website: enabel.be

Enabel is Belgium's federal development agency (formerly Coopération technique belge, CTB).

Belgian official development assistance amounted to US$2.7 billion in 2022 or 0.45% of gross national income (GNI). The top recipient country was Belgium's former colony, the Democratic Republic of the Congo.

Enabel sits within the following system of Belgian development assistance:

- The Directorate-General for Development Cooperation and Humanitarian Aid (DGD) within the Federal Public Service Foreign Affairs, Foreign Trade, and Development Co-operation oversees development co-operation. The Federal Public Service Foreign Affairs, Foreign Trade, and Development Co-operation employs over 150 staff, with 24% stationed in embassies abroad.
- Contributions to multilateral organizations fall under the purview of other federal public services, such as FPS Finance.
- The DGD provides political guidance for specific contributions, including those to the European Commission.
- Enabel executes and coordinates Belgium's international development policy. It has approximately 1,500 staff, with 88% based in country offices overseas.
- The Belgian Investment Company for Developing Countries, Belgium's development finance institution, directly invests in private sector projects in developing and emerging economies.

The agency was formerly called Agence belge de développement CTB (Coopération Technique Belge) and renamed Enabel in 2018.

The chair of the board of directors is Delphine Moralis and Jean Van Wetter is the director-general.

In February 2024, shortly after the Belgian government decided to continue funding UNRWA, the United Nations aid agency for Palestinian refugees, the offices of Enabel within Gaza City were bombed and destroyed by Israeli forces.

== See also ==
- French Development Agency
- GIZ (Germany)
- LuxDev (Luxembourg)
- USAID (United States)
- TIKA (Turkiye)
