= AGMC =

The acronym AGMC may refer to:

- Albany Gay Men's Chorus
- Afghan German Management College
- Agartala Government Medical College
- Atlanta Gay Men's Chorus
- Association du Génie Militaire Canadien
