= Guitarists 4 the Kids =

Guitarists 4 The Kids

Compilation album by Gergs
- Released: September 11, 2006
- Genre: Rock, hard rock, progressive rock, punk rock, blues, flamenco, folk
- Length: 80:05
- Label: Slang Productions.

Artists for Charity - Guitarists 4 the Kids is a compilation album which was produced and arranged by Slang Productions in 2006. Over 18 international artists contributed to the recording project to assist World Vision Canada and their philanthropic efforts.

At over 79 minutes in length, the Artists for Charity album featured a plethora of musical styles including hard rock, punk rock, progressive fusion, nouveau flamenco, blues, folk and experimental.

== Track listing ==
No.	Title	Artist	Length
1.	Guitarists 4 the Kids	Tommy Merry (guitar solo), Joy Basu (guitar solo), Dave Martone (guitar solo), Dan Palladino (guitar solo), Micheal Vick (guitar solo), Mattias "IA" Eklundh (guitar solo), Terry Lauderdale (guitar solo), Ron Thal (guitar solo), Steve Lang (rhythm guitar), Ryan Conroy (bass guitar), Terry Townson (trumpet), Steve Hilliam (saxophone), Darryl Havers (B3 organ), Jovan (drums)	6:36
2.	Blind	Stevie Salas	4:47
3.	S'ok	DramaGods	5:29
4.	Toccata in Dm	Toy Dolls	2:37
5.	This Spring Release 10, 000 Butterflies	Ottmar Liebert	6:03
6.	Journey to Alcazaba	Johannes Linstead	7:07
7.	Highway	Alice Stuart	4:50
8.	I'm Buzzed	Steve Lukather	16:52
9.	Breaking	Bumblefoot	3:31
10.	Zoo Me	Mattias "IA" Eklundh	2:50
11.	Fargo	Neil Zaza	3:34
12.	Falafel à Montségur	Pierre Bensusan	7:26
13.	At the End of Time	Robert Fripp	7:57
			80:05
