= SAO Cambodia =

SAO Cambodia is a Christian development agency which was founded in the United Kingdom in 1973 by a Cambodian Christian, Major Taing Chhirc who was studying in Scotland.

Having worked with Cambodian refugees during and after the Khmer Rouge years, it started operating in Cambodia after the Vietnamese occupation in 1990 when it was registered with the Cambodian Government as a Development NGO.
