= Public utilities of Mymensingh =

The Public utilities of Mymensingh, Bangladesh:

== Electricity ==
The town had its own power generation system which was established in pre-partition India. The powerplant called Bati Kall was situated near the District Court and generated DC electricity using petroleum. Toward the end of the 1960s, Mymensingh was connected to the national power supply grid with a distribution station at Kewatkhali. There is no more DC power. AC power of 220 voltage is supplied. Mymensingh Railway Junction had its own power generation system since early 20th century which was shut down in the 1970s. But now, a 60MW powerplant is established at Kewatkhali.

Recently Rural power co. ltd established a 210 MW ( 4 gas turbine 35 mW and one 70 mW steam turbine) combine cycle power plant besides the Brammaputra river at shamvuganj.

== Water supply ==
Maharaja Surya Kanta Acharya established Mymensingh Water Works, which is the first water supply system of the city. He erected this overhead water reservoir in memory of his wife Raj Rajeswari Debi. Remnants of the waterworks with its purifying and filtering system can still be seen on the Brahmaputra, near the Radhasundari School. One overhead water reservoir still stand at the Ganginarpar crossing. An underground water distribution system was laid subsequently. Also, hydrants were posted in different places to help the pedestrians. However, hydrants were the source of pure water for all since connection to individual houses did not take place till the 1960s. Till the 1960s a lot of people would go to the nearby ponds for taking a bath and many houses had sunken wells to collect underground water.

The Raj Rajeswari water works which is open air water treatment plant is now a day heritage is destroyed by land grovers and lost also current potentials of operations of this plant.

== Telecommunication ==
The national access code of Mymensingh is 091. The digital telephone exchange of Mymensingh was set up in 2001. It was upgraded in 2008 with a capacity of 20 thousand telephone connections.

IP Phone (VOIP) service is also available from BDCom.

== Public call office ==
The only Public Call Office or PCO was situated near the Kachari mosque, close to the Women's Teachers Training College. Towards the end of the 1990s, a number of privately owned call centers sprouted all over the city to cater to the needs to the people. Since 2000, most of these call centers use mobile phone service.

== Gas supply ==
Mymensingh was connected to the national gas distribution network in 1996 but most people still use a kerosene stove or firewood oven. Also many kitchens run on liquefied petroleum gas available in steel bottles.

== Postal service ==
The head post office is situated near the court buildings. There is a night post office near Swadeshi Bazaar. The outgoing postal items are handled by what is called Railway Mail Service, RMS in short, a post office situated just outside Mymensingh Junction. The postman wears a khaki uniform and carries letters in a leather bag. He walks from door to door. The houses are either without any number or the numbers are not organized in a serial order. Most houses have no letter box. The postman knocks the door and makes hand-deliveries.

== Roadways ==
The city is well connected with a road network. However, most of the streets are narrow and driving car is difficult. The concrete roads built up in the 1960s have proved to be good enough to survive next forty years. But other roads are topped with tar and in absence of regular maintenance, coupled with heavy rains potholes and ditches are a common feature. Roads of the city are owned and maintained by the Pourashava. The spinal road of the town stretches from the Town Hall area to the Railway station. It was initial situation but as the city is gradually enlarging, the length of busy road is greatly increasing. Town service is running but the city population never get the chance to get in the bus as the number of buses is inadequate and bus actually runs between peripheral Upazilas.

== Street lamps ==
Street lamps often define built-up area of a city. Before electricity was available, street lamps were set up by the Pourashava. These were decorative iron posts about 7 to 10 feet tall with a shade for putting the lamp at the top. A light man would come in the evening with a ladder and ignite the lamps. The feeble lamps mystified the environment more than removing darkness. They were replaced by electric bulbs hanging from the light posts during the 1950s and 1960s.

== Mymensingh Pourashava ==
The city governance organization is called Mymensingh Pourashava which comprises elected members, supported with government officials. The head of the Pourashava is called Chairman who is assisted by Ward Members. The Mymensingh Pourashava was first established in the year 1859 by Maharaja Surya Kanta Acharya Mymensingh Municipality and as Mymensingh Municipal Committee in 1960. The Mymensingh Municipal Committee was replaced by a Pourashava in 1972 after the independence of Bangladesh. Mymensingh Pourashava covers an area of 21.73 km^{2}. with a population of 188713. It consists of seventeen Mauzas comprising seven wards. The mauzas are Mymensingh town, Balashpur, Bhatikasar, Krishnapur, Sehara, Gopalkandi, Kasar, Golganda, Maskanda, Dholadia, Keatkhali, Chak Chatrapur, Rakta, Akua(part), Chhatrapur (part), Boyra Bhaluka (part) and Khagdahar (part).

== Government agencies ==
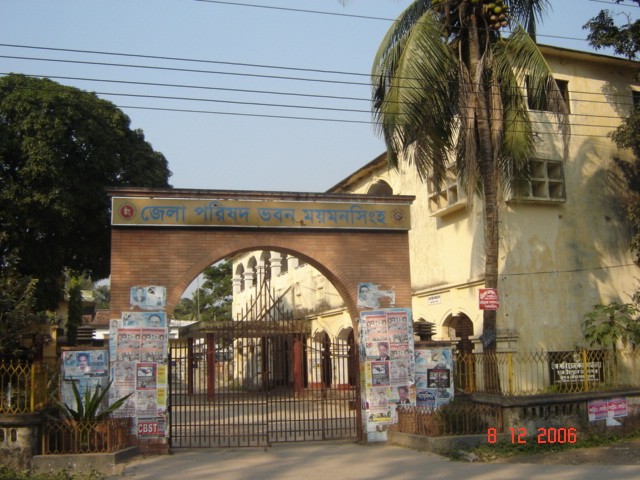
Gateway of Mymensingh District Council

There are many government offices as well as regional offices of private companies located here, including banks, a jute mill, a rice mill, and a power plant (RPCL). The main government office is the office of the Deputy Commissioner. Many government offices have established regional offices in Mymensingh since the 1980s. Local government is known as Mymensingh Zilla Parishad (Tr. Mymensingh District Council) which is effectively a government organization with the Deputy Commissioner as the chief executive.

== Law and order ==
The headquarters of Mymensingh zone of Bangladesh Police is situated near the office of the Deputy Commissioner. The chief of the office is called Superintendent of Police, close to the Brahmaputra. Local law and order is the responsibility of Police Stations and Police Fari (post). Police has a traffic section entrusted to control the traffic of the city. Officer in charge of a police station is commonly referred to as OC (officer-in-charge) who is often regarded as the most powerful person since can he can arrest a person, held him custody, prosecute in the court or even release him on bail if he so wishes. The second officer is often referred to as Daroga and more often seen around with some constables. The police residential area is called Police Line which is situated on the outskirts along the Mymensingh-Tangail Road near the residence of the District Judge.

== Revenue collection ==
Net contribution of Mymensingh to national revenue is traditionally poor for high cost of collection of land revenue. Tahshilders visit the landlords once year serving the demand note which is the tax assessment notice. When industrialization started in the 1960s, some excises were collected. The collection of Business Turnover Tax (BTT) and its successor Value Added Tax (VAT) from remains insignificant because of predominance of small size business. Revenue (VAT) from handmade cigarette called Birhi (Bidi) still predominates.

== Judiciary ==
Land litigation is the main category of cases faced by the judiciary. Justice is dispensed by the District Judge's Court and its subordinate courts. The District Judge is the chief of the district judiciary. Annada Shankar Ray served as the 32nd District Judge of Mymensingh from 14 January 1946 to 3 October 1946. Courts are situated around the District Collectorate. The head of civil administration, that is, the Deputy Commissioner functions as the District Magistrate, and Magistrate Courts are supervised by him. In 2008, Magistrates Courts were put under the control of the District Judge. It is amusing to note that government did not want that the judges socialize and thereby get influenced. To limit their movement, they were not provided a motor car although in terms of rank they were no less than the Deputy Magistrate, the top bureaucrat of the district. Even in the 1950s the District Judge would come to the court riding bicycle from his residence which is about 5 kilometers away near the Police Line. It is in the 1980s that the government under president Ershad sanctioned a car for the district judges.

== Circuit House ==
The Circuit House was built up to accommodate the Circuit bench of the High Court which was occasionally sit in Mymensingh to dispense with appeal cases and decide writ petitions. A nicely built one story building with red color, it has a number of spacious rooms decorated with old paintings. It is the de facto hotel for the government officials and dignitaries since the 1950s. It was expanded in the 1990s.

== Officers' Club ==
The first Officers' Club was established in the British era on the college Road near the Muslim Balika Bidyalaya. A posh club with a lawn tennis court and bar, in addition to other recreational facilities, was established in the 1960s behind the residence of the Deputy Commissioner, near the park on the Brahmaputra.

== See also ==
- Electricity sector in Bangladesh
- Water supply and sanitation in Bangladesh
- Telecommunications in Bangladesh
