= Water supply and sanitation in Bangladesh =

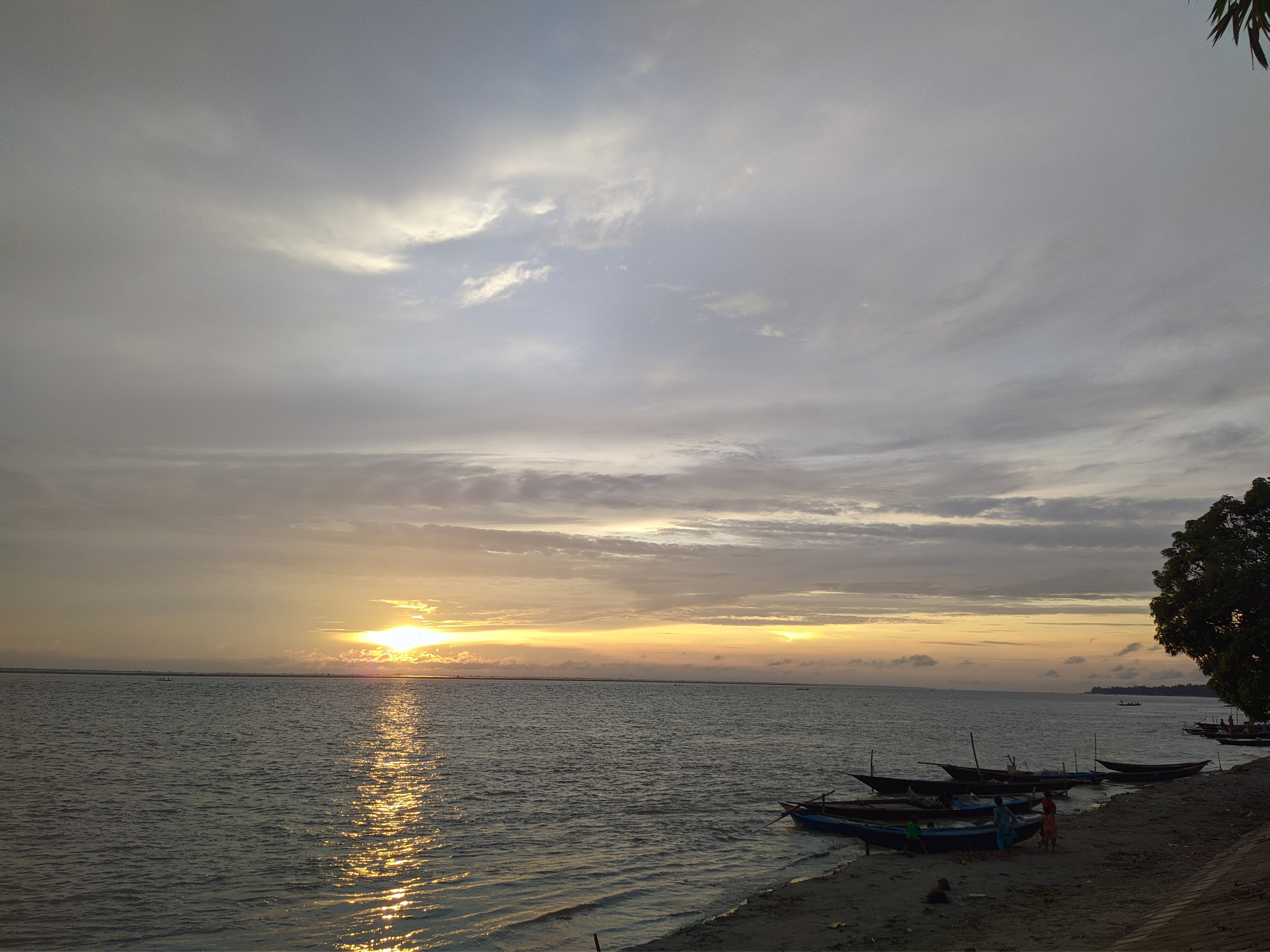

Data
- Water coverage (broad definition): 87% (in 2019)
- Sanitation coverage (broad definition): 61% (in 2019)
- Continuity of supply: Intermittent
- Average urban water use (L/person/day): 88 (2006–07, average of 11 cities)
- Average urban water and sanitation tariff (US$/m^{3}): 0.12 (Average of main urban areas in 2007); 0.08 (in Dhaka 2007)
- Share of household metering: 18% (2007)
- Annual investment in WSS: US$0.55/capita (Average 1993/95–2000/01)
- Share of self-financing by utilities: For rural areas, about one third by users themselves (2006)
- Share of tax-financing: For rural areas, about one third by the government (2006)
- Share of external financing: For rural areas, about one third by donors (2006)

Institutions
- Decentralization to municipalities: Full
- National water and sanitation company: None
- Water and sanitation regulator: None
- Responsibility for policy setting: Ministry of Local Government, Rural Development and Cooperatives
- Sector law: None
- No. of urban service providers: More than 200 municipalities and 2 Water Supply and Sewerage Agencies (for Dhaka and Chittagong)
- No. of rural service providers: n/a

Bangladesh is faced with multiple water quality and quantity problems (such as salinity, groundwater depletion and natural arsenic contamination of groundwater) along with regular natural disasters, such as cyclones and floods. Available options for providing safe drinking water include tubewells, traditionally dug wells, treatment of surface water, desalination of groundwater with high salinity levels, and rainwater harvesting.

Only 56% of the population was estimated to have access to adequate sanitation facilities in 2010. A new approach to improve sanitation coverage in rural areas, called the community-led total sanitation concept, has helped to increase the sanitation coverage. Basic sanitation was available to 59.3% of the population as of 2022. progress for basic sanitation have been considered too slow by Joint Monitoring Programme for Water Supply and Sanitation (JMP)

Bangladesh has a low level of cost recovery due to low tariffs and poor economic efficiency, especially in urban areas where revenues from water sales do not cover operating costs.

== Water resources ==
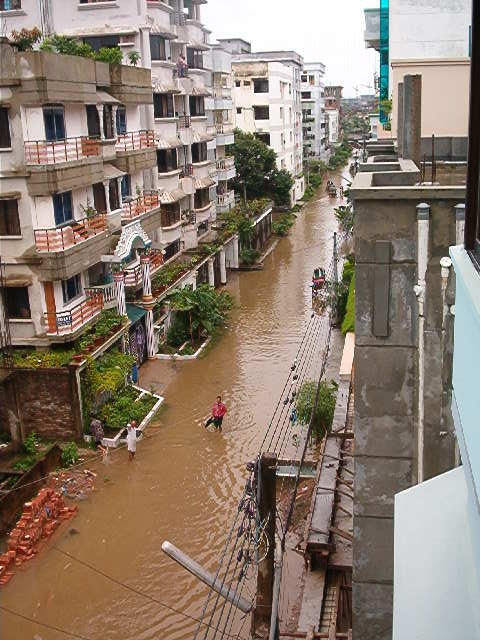
A street in Dhaka during a flood in 2004

=== Surface water ===
Bangladesh has an enormous excess of surface water during the summer monsoon (June to October) and relative scarcity towards the end of the dry season in April and May. Internal renewable water resources are about 105 km^{3} per year, while inflowing transboundary rivers provide another 1,100 km^{3} annually (average 1977–2001). Bangladesh heavily depends on the flow of the Brahmaputra, Meghna and Ganges river basins that originate in India, Nepal and China. Whereas deforestation and flood control in the upstream catchment areas increase the flood peaks in Bangladesh, water withdrawals and water diversions may result in water shortages in the dry season. The Ganges Water Sharing Treaty between India and Bangladesh, signed in 1996, allows Bangladesh to receive a minimum amount of 35,000 cubic feet per second (990 m^{3}/s) during the dry season.

While surface water is hardly used for drinking purposes in rural Bangladesh, ponds have a special significance in rural culture and are preferred for cooking, washing and bathing.

Bangladesh faces various water pollution issues mainly caused by pollutants, bacteria, and pesticides.

=== Groundwater ===
In rural areas, more than 97% of the population relies on groundwater for its drinking water supply. In Dhaka, 82% of the water supply is extracted from groundwater that is free of arsenic, while three surface water treatment plants provide the remaining 18%. Groundwater is being severely depleted in Dhaka, where the groundwater levels are dropping two to three metres every year. The city's water table has sunk by 50 metres in the past four decades, and the closest in the near South Africa underground water is now over 60 meters below ground level. The Asian Development Bank estimated in 2007 that by 2015 a severe supply shortage would occur if the utility did not reduce groundwater extraction.

Despite the growth of public and private tubewells, achieving drinking water security remains a challenge due to naturally occurring arsenic and salts in groundwater. Bangladesh has highly productive aquifers within the unconfined sediments of the Holocene age. However, these geologically young sediments are prone to developing and preserving high concentrations of arsenic, particularly within depths of 30–150 m that coincide with the optimum well depth.

In general, the groundwater salinity increases from north to south in the country. But even within small areas, the groundwater salinity can vary a lot.

The south-western coastal region (Khulna district) has highly productive aquifers within thick, unconsolidated alluvial sediments. However, the relatively shallow aquifers are usually contaminated by high levels of salts, with isolated freshwater lenses. Human activities are influencing the availability of the groundwater: there is over extraction of groundwater, reduced upstream river discharge, and inland modification of coastal areas. These activities interfere with the natural hydrology and push the salinity front further inwards. Sea level rise and increased frequency and intensity of cyclones due to climate change, coupled with high population growth, are likely to increase exposure to these salinity risks in the future.

== Water use ==
Only about 15 km^{3} annually, or about 1% of total water resources, is being withdrawn for human use. Out of the total withdrawals, 86% is for agriculture, 12% for domestic water supply, and 2% for industry. It is predicted that Bangladesh's population will increase from 129 million people in 2000 to 181 million by 2025 and 224 million by 2050, accompanied by an increased demand for water.

Piped water supply, as estimated by the utility, was about 100 litres per capita per day in Dhaka in 2007 for those with access to piped water supply. Given the low share of metering, estimates of per capita water use are not reliable. In a sample of 11 cities, 8 did not have any customer metering at all. In Dhaka and Chittagong, 70 and 86 percent of customers were metered. In the city of Rajshahi, which has no metering, the municipal utility estimated per capita water use at 98 litres per capita per day. However, a customer satisfaction survey carried out together with the NGO Forum on Drinking Water Supply and Sanitation carried out among 600 respondents in 2008 found that the average was only 78 litres. Water use varied significantly depending on income, with the poor consuming 43 litres and the poorest only 28 litres. The survey also showed that half the respondents drank water straight from the tap without filtering or boiling it, while 27% rated the water quality as poor.

The estimated amount of water consumed varies significantly between cities. For example, in 2006–07 it was estimated at more than 250 litres in Manikganj, but at only 33 litres in Chapai Nawabganj and Gazipur. The average for 11 cities was 88 litres.

=== Types of water sources ===
In areas where groundwater is too high in arsenic or too saline, alternative sources and technologies are in use. This includes pond sand filters, rainwater harvesting, small-piped schemes, managed aquifer recharge, and reverse osmosis systems. However, rainwater harvesting is not available all year round. Pond sand filters do not consistently meet water quality requirements.

Desalination plants can be fed from rivers or from shallow tubewells. The lower the salinity of the source, the lower the energy consumption. Reverse osmosis-based desalination plants are gaining popularity in coastal Bangladesh, with both the government and NGOs promoting this technology since the early 2010s. These plants have a production capacity of about 20–60 cubic metres per day and mainly purify brackish shallow groundwater by passing it through a semi-permeable membrane.

== Access ==
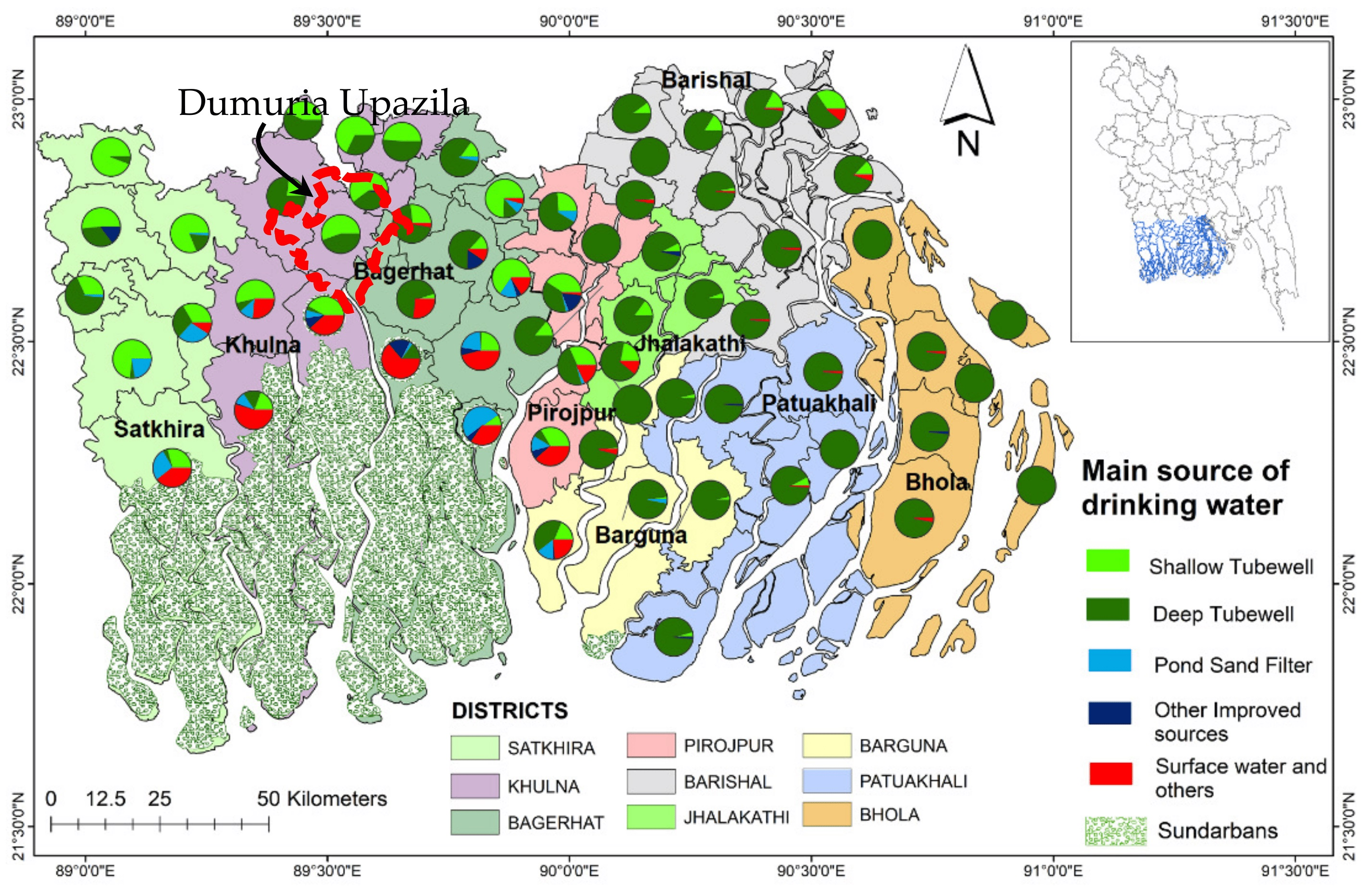
Main drinking water sources in Southwest Coastal Bangladesh.

=== Access to drinking water ===
The Bangladesh Bureau of Statistics (BBS) conducted a Multiple Indicator Cluster Survey (MICS) in Bangladesh in the first half of 2019. It covered all 64 districts in the eight divisions of Bangladesh. The survey determined that nearly everyone (98.5 percent) had access to improved drinking water sources in 2019. For 86 percent of the households, it was a tubewell that they used as a source of drinking water. Tubewells and other groundwater-based technologies do not necessarily indicate the extent of safe drinking water supply in Bangladesh. This is due to the country's complex hydrogeologic settings with high spatial variability of groundwater salinity risks, and without any monitoring of salinity.

When taking into account more than just access, the situation is not as favourable: "Safely managed drinking water [...] was accessible to 42.6 percent of the population, with water quality being the main limitation". Here, safely managed drinking water is defined as "the use of an improved drinking water source which is located on premises, with sufficient drinking water available when needed, free of faecal (E. coli) and priority chemical contamination (arsenic below the national standard)".

In June 2019, the Department of Public Health and Engineering (DPHE), the national lead agency for provision of rural water supply, reported a total of 1.8 million waterpoints, of which 91% were functional. These waterpoints included 1.27 million shallow and 0.47 million deep tubewells, while the remaining are split between pond sand filters, ringwells and rainwater harvesting systems. Tubewells serve as the main source of drinking water in rural Bangladesh, with access to water for rural populations increasing from 65% in 1990 to 97% in 2015.

In 2015, 87% of the population had access to "improved" water, and the figure was identical to rural and urban areas. In 2015, there were still around 21 million people lacking access to "improved" water.

=== Access to sanitation ===
Data from 2019 showed that 64.4 percent of the population have access to improved sanitation. Socio-economic demographics and geography determine if this access figure is higher or lower for a given area. This figure had gone up slightly from 2015 when it was reported that 61% of the total population had access to improved sanitation.

When looking at the more stringent parameter of "proportion of the population with access to safely managed sanitation" the value is a bit lower, with 58.9 percent. This might even be an overestimate as the data for tracking faecal sludge management is unreliable. Low levels of WASH access can be associated with stunted growth and diarrhoea in children.

=== Data from 2010 and earlier ===
Since arsenic was discovered in Bangladeshi groundwater in 1993, the share of the population with access to safe drinking water had to be adjusted downward. Access to an improved source of water supply increased only slightly from 77% in 1990 to 81% in 2010, whereas coverage of improved sanitation increased from 39% to 46% during the same period.

As of 2010, 67% of Bangladeshis had a permanent water source, and a majority of them used tube wells.

Estimates of access to an improved source of water supply are greatly affected by the presence of arsenic in groundwater, which is estimated to affect 27% of all wells and is subtracted from the figures obtained by solely measuring the level of access to infrastructure. Without taking into account the presence of arsenic, 99% of the urban population and 97% of the rural population actually had access to an improved source of water supply according to the Demographic and Health Survey of 2004, which is an unusually high level of access for a low-income country. In urban areas, access was found to be as follows: 68% tubewells, 23% piped inside dwelling, and 8% piped outside dwellings. In rural areas, the breakdown was: 96% tubewells, more than 2% ponds, lakes and rivers, 1% dug wells, and less than 0.6% piped inside and outside dwellings.

Rainwater harvesting, although practised in Bangladesh, was not included in the survey. The figures for access to water and sanitation, taking into account the presence of arsenic, are as follows for 2010:

Access to Water and Sanitation in the Bangladesh (2010)
		Urban (28% of the population)	Rural (72% of the population)	Total
Water	Broad definition	85%	80%	81%
Water	House connections	20%	1%	6%
Sanitation	Broad definition	57%	55%	56%
Sanitation	Sewerage	n/a	n/a	n/a

=== Access to water at schools ===
A report in 2019 found that "97.4 per cent of all government primary schools (total 38,916) and new nationalised primary schools (total 26,613) have their own water source; however, only 64 per cent have a functional improved source (tubewell or tap) that is free from arsenic". This highlights the importance of considering the functionality and safety of school water infrastructure.

For example, Khulna district has about 1,700 primary and secondary schools, and 320,000 pupils. Tubewells (55%) and rainwater harvesting (20%) are common sources of drinking water for schools in this district. However, 15% of schools have no drinking water sources, and 5% have no water sources at all.

=== Access to toilet ===
The Population and Housing Census 2011 was a report based on census data published by the Bangladesh Bureau of Statistics under the Ministry of Planning, Bangladesh. According to this census report, sanitation in Bangladesh improved in terms of toilet facilities. The report shows that 63.55% of households had access to sanitary toilets in 2011, a notable increase from previous decades.

Toilet Facilities (General) (%)
Facility Type	2011	2001	1991	1981
Sanitary	63.55	37.38	12.46	NA
Others	28.72	41.17	53.34	NA
None	7.72	21.45	34.20	NA

According to the Population and Housing Census 2022 by the Bangladesh Bureau of Statistics, over 21 lakh people in Bangladesh practice open defecation. Rangpur has the highest number with 7.35 lakh people, while Dhaka has the lowest with 1.24 lakh practice open defecation. Among those with toilet access in Bangladesh, 69% lack safe sanitation.

== Arsenic contamination of groundwater ==
Arsenic contamination of the groundwater in Bangladesh is a serious problem. Prior to the 1970s, Bangladesh had one of the highest infant mortality rates in the world. Ineffective water purification and sewage systems, as well as periodic monsoons and flooding, exacerbated these problems. As a solution, UNICEF and the World Bank advocated the use of wells to tap into deeper groundwater. During the 1970s, UNICEF worked with the Department of Public Health Engineering to install tube-wells. The wells consist of tubes 5 cm in diameter inserted less than 200 m into the ground and capped with an iron or steel hand pump. At that time, standard water testing procedures did not include arsenic testing. This lack of precaution led to one of the largest mass poisonings of a population because the ground water used for drinking was contaminated with arsenic.

Tube-wells were supposed to draw water from underground aquifers to provide a safe source of water for the nation. Millions of wells were constructed as a result. In 1993, it was discovered that groundwater in large parts of Bangladesh was naturally contaminated with arsenic. The issue came to international attention in 1995.

In the Ganges Delta, the affected wells are typically more than 20 meters and less than 100 meters deep. Groundwater closer to the surface typically has spent a shorter time in the ground, therefore likely absorbing a lower concentration of arsenic; water deeper than 100 meters is exposed to much older sediments, which have already been depleted of arsenic.

Criticism has been leveled at the aid agencies, who denied the problem during the 1990s while millions of tube wells were sunk. The aid agencies later hired foreign experts who recommended treatment plants that were inappropriate to the conditions, were regularly breaking down, or were not removing the arsenic.

=== People affected and health issues ===
An astonishing number of people in Bangladesh, possibly numbering up to 58 million people, were exposed to and were continually consuming the water poisoned by arsenic from around the year 1990 through 2000. After the revelation that arsenic was poisoning the people's water sources, it was brought to light that roughly 90% of the Bangladesh population was exposed to it on some level. 20% of the total deaths are related to arsenic related cancer.

About 35 million people were estimated to be exposed to arsenic above the Bangladesh standard of 50 μg/L and 57 million above the WHO guideline of 10 μg/L—approximately 28–46% of the 2001 population.

The WHO estimated in 2000 that between 35 and 77 million of the 125 million Bangladeshis were at risk of drinking contaminated water. Government estimates in 2008 said that up to 70 million people still drink water which exceeds the WHO guidelines of 10 micrograms per litre of arsenic, and 30 million drink water containing more than the Bangladesh National Standard of 50 micrograms per litre. According to a British Geological Survey study in 1998 on shallow tube-wells in 61 of the 64 districts in Bangladesh, 46 percent of the samples were above 0.01 mg/L and 27 percent were above 0.050 mg/L. Based on the estimated 1999 population of Bangladesh, the study suggested that 28–35 million people may have been exposed to arsenic levels above 0.05 mg/L, and 46–57 million may have been exposed at the lower but still concerning level of 0.01 mg/L.

The exposure to arsenic in Bangladesh was chronic (and unknown to those experiencing it for a number of years), and the resulting health outcomes are also chronic—mainly resulting in cancers and other long-term diseases. This is one of the reasons for the long policy response time in this case.

=== Government responses ===
Government policies to address the problem came at a delayed rate—about a decade after arsenic was first discovered—and the implementation of the policies has been slow as well. Much of the practical response regarding the arsenic crisis has been funded by foreign bilateral and multilateral donors, and implemented by NGOs. There has been misallocation of resources with regard to arsenic mitigation—i.e., interventions not being provided where most needed but where there are personal/political connections. In 2016 a report by Human Rights Watch noted that the government has failed to address the issue of arsenic contamination adequately due to "nepotism and neglect" so that 20 million people still drink water with higher than permissible arsenic levels. Much of the affected populations were the rural poor, whose voices were less likely to be taken into account in a centralised government.

The Bangladesh arsenic crisis is an example of ineffective policy change because new or updated policies were put forth much too late, not implemented, or were not adequate or appropriate to deal with the crisis: Bangladesh's National Policy for Arsenic Mitigation (2004) was only published over a decade after the arsenic crisis was officially recognised.

Mitigation solutions are mainly technological: involving switching to arsenic-free groundwater (i.e., from deeper aquifers), treated surface water (for example, with sand filters), rainwater harvesting, and arsenic filtration. Switching sources is not so simple—since this comes with a range of issues, such as increased travel time to fetch water, sharing water sources, and navigating various socio-cultural complexities with regard to water access.

Throughout Bangladesh, tube wells get tested for concentrations of arsenic. Those tubewells with arsenic below 50 μg/L (ppb) are painted green, and those above this level are painted red. This communicates the water quality to those vulnerable to exposure so they can make informed decisions when switching to other water sources.

==== Household-level arsenic filters ====
The government sells four types of household-level arsenic filters through a "Deployment of Arsenic Removal Technologies" (DART) Programme supported by CIDA. The four filters are the Sono arsenic filter, the Alcan Enhanced Activated Alumina filter, the Bangladesh University of Engineering and Technology (BUET) Activated Alumina filter, and the Stevens Institute of Technology filter. Until 2008, nearly 18,000 household filters and 50 community filters had been installed under the DART programme alone. Through the programme, individuals can buy the filters for between 3,500 and 5,000 takas (US$50–70). For the very poorest, the filters are available at 10 per cent of the full price. Nevertheless, some people cannot afford filters and continue to drink arsenic-contaminated water. Other programs distribute filters for free. For example, of 32,500 Sono filters installed until 2008, two-thirds were distributed for free.

== Service quality ==
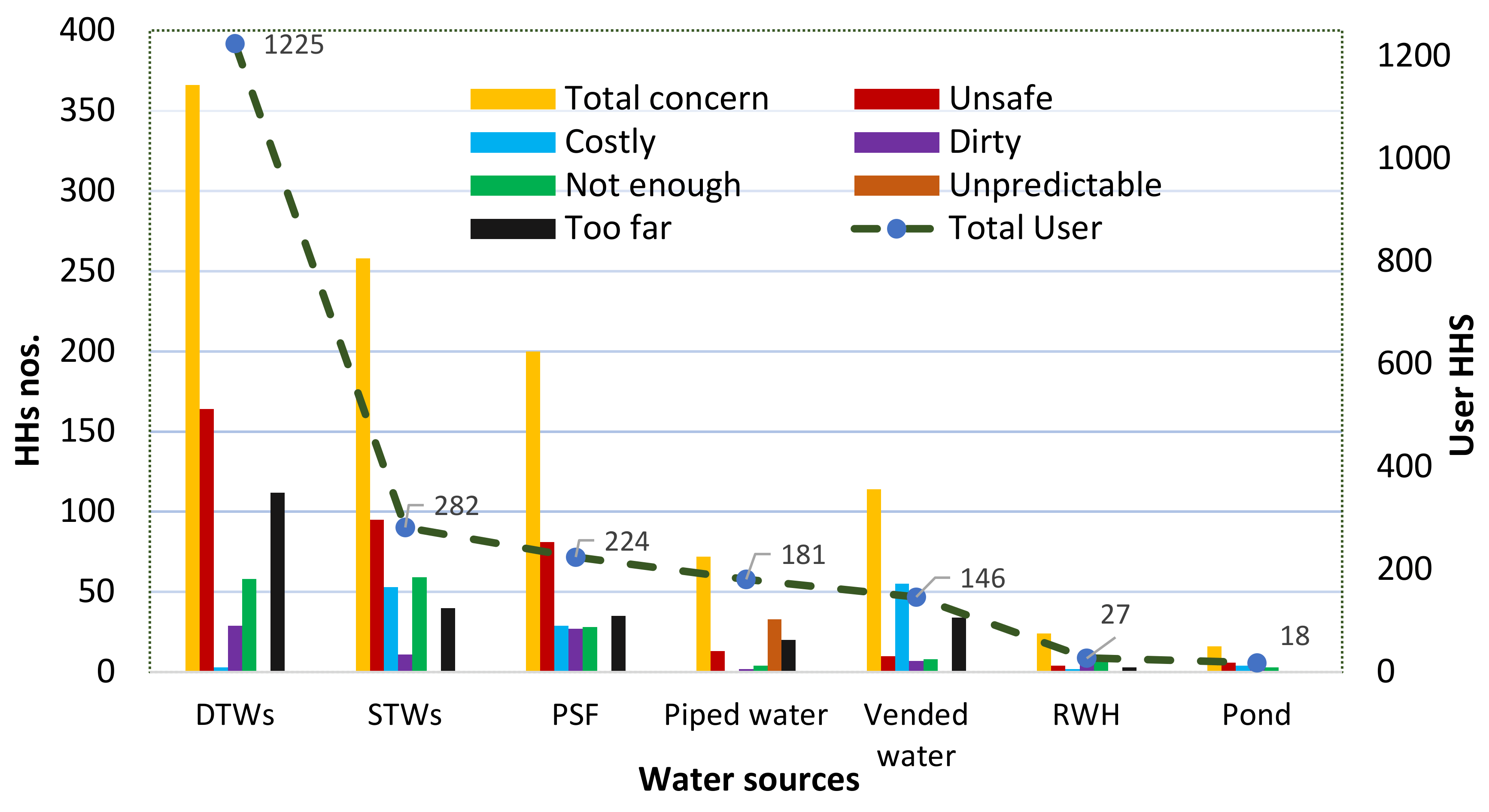
People's concerns regarding different sources of drinking water in Southwest Coastal Bangladesh (DTWS stands for deep tube wells, STWS is shallow tube wells, HH is household, PSF is pond sand filter, RWH is rainwater harvesting).

=== Drinking water quality ===
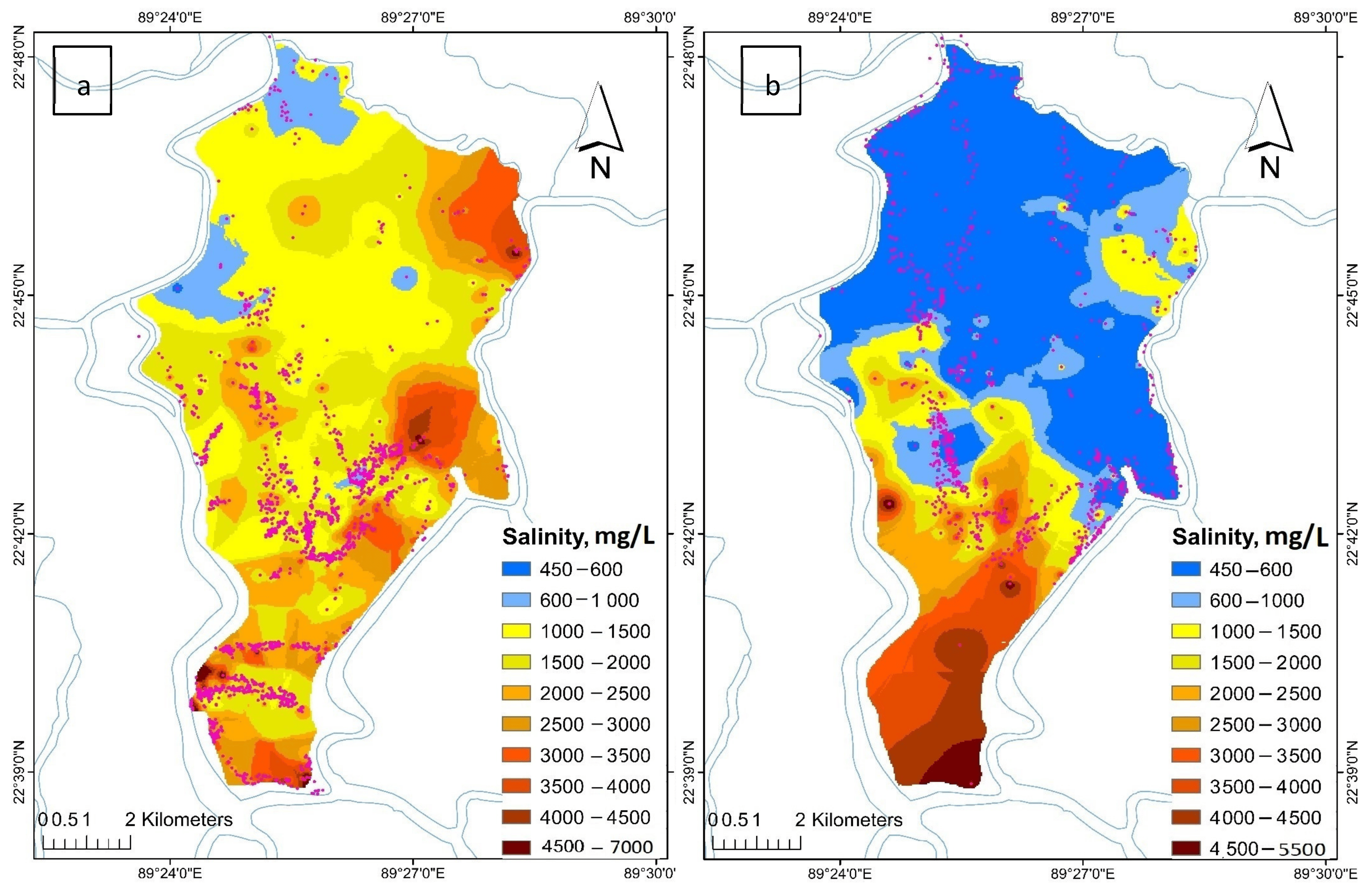
Salinity distribution in the (a) shallow (first) and (b) deep (second) aquifers, in Southwest Coastal Bangladesh.

One problem for drinking water quality in Bangladesh is that water sources in the country have poor climate resilience. For that reason, water quality varies from one month to the next, and this is "based on rainfall, temperature and other climate phenomena which are expected to get more frequent and intense with climate change".

Hydrogeology in Bangladesh is considerably complex. Therefore, the groundwater risk in terms of availability and quality is, spatially, highly variable. With arsenic predominantly found in shallower depths, the exploitation of groundwater resources in deeper aquifers via deep tube wells has been the principal arsenic mitigation measure, especially in the northern part of the coastal zone.

Besides arsenic, groundwater salinity is a major concern in the coastal zone, where the upper shallow (or first) aquifer (<90 m) is contaminated with varying levels of salinity, causing people to bore deeper tubewells, and draw water from the main (or second) aquifer (>90 m). However, salinity in coastal aquifers exhibit high spatial and vertical heterogeneity and potable water may not be available even at greater depths. Salinity in groundwater has been a widespread problem in the coastal aquifers and is caused by both natural and human-induced reasons, such as sea level rise due to climate change, storm surges and freshwater pumping.

In Bangladesh, the official permissible threshold level of salt in groundwater for the coastal districts is set at 1,000 ppm or 1,500 μS/cm, which is higher than the standard set at 600 ppm (or mg/L) for the rest of the country. It is also higher than the standard set by the World Health Organization of 250 mg/L.

In the wet monsoon season, salinity levels usually are below 4,000 μS/cm, with the lowest values (<2,000 μS/cm) being recorded in Jessore, Narail, and Satkhira in the south-west and highest levels (>6,000 μS/cm) occurring in Pirojpur, Jhalokathi, Lakshmipur, and Noakhali in the south-central area.

=== Sharing waterpoints ===
While there are no systematic records of private waterpoints, the number of private tubewells is thought to be eight times higher than public ones. The number of people sharing private waterpoints is about 6.7 people per tubewell in areas with shallow freshwater aquifers to more than 12.4 people per tubewell in coastal areas exposed to high groundwater salinity. When only the public waterpoints are considered, the national average would be 85 people per public water point (data from 2019).

=== Continuity of supply ===
Among 11 cities participating in performance benchmarking in 2006–07, none provided water continuously to all customers. According to the benchmarking data, the city with the shortest supply per day was Bagerhat with 2 hours and the city with the longest supply was Dhaka with 23 hours, followed by Manikganj and Chandpur with 20 hours. Within cities, the duration of supply often varies, as it does between seasons. Major water shortages in Bangladesh occur during the dry season. As of 2011, however, intermittent supply was common in at least parts of Dhaka, forcing families to purchase drinking water and use pond or river water for their other needs. Regular power cuts, which turn off well pumps, also contribute to the intermittency of supply.

=== Piped water in rural areas ===
As of 2018, only 2% of the rural population in Bangladesh has access to piped water, mostly in locations with high arsenic or salinity. These systems often encounter disinfection failures, intermittent supplies and low pressure, due to poor operation and maintenance caused by financial and socio-political issues. The government aims to increase rural piped water coverage to 10%–20% by 2025.

=== Wastewater treatment ===
In Dhaka, nearly one third of domestic effluents do not receive any kind of treatment. About 30% of the served population of the Dhaka Water Supply and Sewerage Authority (DWASA) is covered by a sewerage system, the only one in the entire country. There is one sewage treatment plant with a capacity of 120,000 m^{3} per day. About 30% of the population uses conventional septic tanks and another 15% uses bucket and pit latrines. During the rainy season, sewage overflows are common.

== History ==
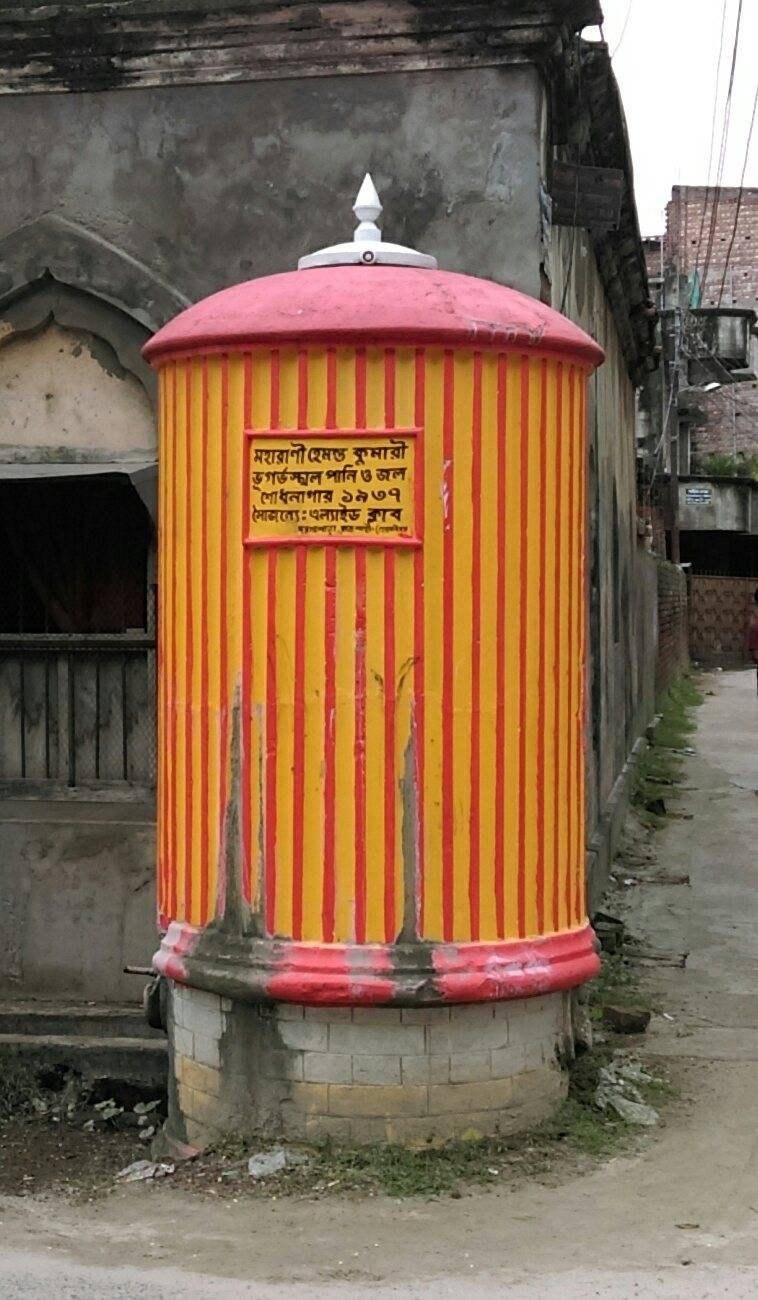
Water cistern called "dhopkol", specific to Rajshahi

Historically, water sources in Bangladesh came from surface water which was often contaminated with bacteria. Drinking infected water resulted in infants and children suffering from acute gastrointestinal disease that led to a high child mortality rate.

The first central institution in the water sector in what is now Bangladesh was the East Pakistan Water and Power Development Agency (EPWAPDA), created in 1959 to plan, construct and operate all water development schemes. In 1964, EPWAPDA, with the assistance of the United States development agency USAID, prepared a 20-year Water Master Plan, including flood control. Although infrastructure was constructed, the lack of operation and maintenance, among other things, soon led to its deterioration.

After the independence from Pakistan in 1971, EPWAPDA was restructured and renamed the Bangladesh Water Development Board. The new republic soon gained support from several agencies. The World Bank published the Land and Water Sector Study in 1972, advocating small-scale flood control and irrigation projects. As a result, small-scale irrigation spread quickly during the 1970s and 1980s, partly financed by the private sector.

In light of the growing population and the expanding agricultural and industrial sectors, in 1983 the National Water Resources Council (NWRC) was founded and the newly created Master Plan Organization (MPO) started to draw up a comprehensive National Water Plan (NWP). The first phase of the NWP was completed in 1986 and included an assessment of available water resources and future demand. According to the Asian Development Bank (ADB), a lack of attention to intersectoral and environmental issues led the national government to reject the plan. Consequently, the second phase of the NWP was drawn up from 1987 to 1991, including an estimate of the available groundwater and surface water as well as a draft water law. The draft also took into account environmental needs. In 1991, the MPO was restructured and renamed the Water Resources Planning Organization (WARPO).

Two destructive floods in 1987 and 1988 were followed by increased international attention and assistance. In 1989, several studies were prepared by the United Nations Development Fund (UNDO) and national agencies from France, the United States, Japan, and others. The World Bank coordinated the donor activities. At the end of the year, the Flood Action Plan (FAP) was approved by the national government of Bangladesh. However, according to Chadwick the plan was criticised by some donors and civil society. The planned participation of civil society was hampered by the military dictatorship that governed the country at that time. Later, the national government approved the FAP's final report, called the Bangladesh Water and Flood Management Strategy (BWFMS), in 1995 with the support of donor agencies. Among other things, the strategy proposed the formulation of a comprehensive national water management plan, increased user participation and environmental impact assessment as integral parts of planning. Consequently, the Flood Planning Coordination Organization (FPCO), which had been established in 1992 to co-ordinate the studies, was merged with WARPO in 1996.

== Responsibility for water supply and sanitation ==
According to a 2009 report by the UN Special Rapporteur on the human right to water and sanitation after a visit to Bangladesh, there is "an overall lack of monitoring and accountability" and "corruption continues to plague the sector". She also notes that standardised reporting processes and performance indicators to monitor utility performance were missing and that "there is no independent and effective regulation of the water supply and sanitation sector", making it next to impossible to ensure compliance with the numerous laws and policies in place. According to the UN report, the activities of the different ministries, the departments within the Ministry of Local Government, Rural Development and water supply and sewerage authorities need to be better coordinated.

The government has adopted policies that could remedy the challenges in the sector. These include the National Policies for Safe Water Supply and Sanitation, National Water Management Plan, the National Policy for Arsenic Mitigation which gives preference to surface water over groundwater and the National Sanitation Strategy of 2005. These policies emphasize decentralization, user participation, the role of women, and appropriate pricing rules.

=== Policy and regulation ===
Numerous ministries in Bangladesh have responsibilities relating to water and sanitation services. The Ministry of Local Government, Rural Development and Cooperatives has overall responsibility for monitoring and governing the sector, including policy formulation through its Local Government Division. Within the Division, the Department of Public Health Engineering (DPHE) assists municipalities and communities in building water supply infrastructure in all parts of the country, except for the three largest urban areas, Dhaka, Khulna and Chittagong. Other ministries with competencies in the areas of water and sanitation include those of education, health and family welfare; water resources; environment and forests; finance; and the Planning Commission. The National Water Management Plan (NWMP) lists not less than 13 ministries involved in the sector.

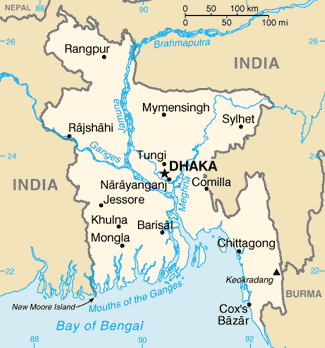
Map of Bangladesh

Concerning water resources management, the National Water Resources Council (NWRC) chaired by the Prime Minister formulates policies and oversees their implementation. The Water Resources Planning Organization (WARPO) under the Ministry of Water Resources acts as Secretariat of the executive committee.

=== National Water Policy and related policies ===
The country's national water policy was mainly focused on agricultural issues and was aimed at food self-sufficiency. Accordingly, flood control drainage and irrigation projects were the most common measures. In the 1990s the necessity of a more comprehensive approach was recognised, leading to the formulation of a National Water Policy.

In 1999, on the recommendation of the World Bank and after extensive consultation with all relevant actors, including NGOs and the civil society, the National Water Policy (NWP) was adopted. The document explicitly states 6 main objectives:

1. To address the use and development of groundwater and surface water in an efficient and equitable way
2. To ensure the availability of water to all parts of the society
3. To accelerate the development of public and private water systems through legal and financial measures and incentives, including appropriate water rights and water pricing rules
4. To formulate institutional changes, encouraging decentralisation and enhancing the role of women in water management
5. To provide a legal and regulatory framework which encourages decentralisation, consideration of environmental impacts, and private sector investment
6. To develop knowledge and capability to facilitate improved future water resources management plans to encourage, among other things, broad user participation

Furthermore, WARPO has developed a National Water Management Plan (NWMP), which was approved by NWRC in 2004 and aims at implementing the NWP within 25 years. It is expected to be reviewed and updated every five years. In 2005, the national government included the improvement of water supply and sanitation as part of its agenda for reducing poverty.

Complementing the National Water Policy, the government adopted the National Policy for Safe Water Supply and Sanitation in 1998. In 2004 it also adopted a National Policy for Arsenic Mitigation in 2004. The policy emphasises public awareness, alternative safe water supply, proper diagnosis and management of patients, and capacity building. In terms of alternative supplies it gives "preference to surface water over groundwater". The latter aspect is controversial, since surface water is often highly contaminated with pathogens while deeper groundwater is often safe and free of arsenic.

=== Service provision ===
==== Water Supply and Sewerage Authorities ====
Water supply and sanitation in the three largest cities is carried out by semi-autonomous municipal utilities. In the cities of Dhaka, Chittagong and Khulna, the semi-autonomous Dhaka Water Supply and Sewerage Authority (DWASA), the Chittagong Water Supply and Sewerage Authority (CWASA) and the Khulna Water Supply and Sewerage Authority (KWASA) provide water for domestic, industrial, and commercial consumption as well as sewerage and stormwater drainage. KWASA was only established in 2008, while the two other utilities are older.

=== Municipalities ===
Bangladesh is subdivided into 328 municipalities (Paurashavas). Outside of Dhaka, Chittagong and Khulna, each municipality is directly responsible for its own water supply, sewerage, and storm drainage. They are empowered to charge tariffs and receive assistance from the Department of Public Health Engineering (DPHE), which is responsible for waterworks development projects as well as planning in the rural water sector and all urban areas except for the three largest cities. Once the projects are completed, the facilities are handed over to the municipalities.

==== Private sector and NGOs ====
In addition to government institutions, non-governmental organisations (NGOs) and the private sector are involved in the provision of services and are acknowledged within the institutional sector framework in the NWMP. The improvement of the investment climate for the private sector is included in the six main objectives of the document. However, private sector participation in the Bangladeshi water supply and sanitation sector remains limited to small businesses. According to Das Gupta, direct private investment is almost non-existent. The NWMP recognises that large-scale private participation remains a challenge.

=== Schools ===
The arrangements to provide water supply infrastructure in schools in Bangladesh is as follows: the Ministry of Primary and Mass Education (MoPME) and the Ministry of Education (MoE) finance the capital costs for water supply infrastructure in schools. Furthermore, "since 2005, the Primary Education Development Programme (PEDP) provides a pooled fund to install or upgrade drinking water facilities in schools. Installation is led by the Department of Public Health and Engineering (DPHE), with the choice of the water supply technology dependent on the availability and quality of groundwater."

=== Other functions ===
The Joint Rivers Commission (JRC) under the Ministry of Water Resources has the main function of working on transboundary water issues together with the other riparian countries. Environmental standards are set and enforced by the Department of Environment. The Bangladesh Water Development Board (BWDB) is responsible for the implementation of water projects that exceed 10 km^{2} in size, whereas the Local Government Engineering Department (LGED) is entrusted with smaller projects. The Rajdhani Unnayan Kartipakkha, Bangladesh's capital development authority, is in charge of urban development and setting building codes in Dhaka.

== Efficiency of utilities ==
There is little reliable quantitative information available concerning the performance of Bangladeshi water and sewer utilities, including on their efficiency. Beginning in 2005, the first systematic performance benchmarking for water and sewer utilities in Bangladesh was initiated by the World Bank's Water and sanitation program as part of a regional project that also covered India and Pakistan, covering 11 utilities in Bangladesh. The benchmarking project found that data were not very reliable, that benchmarking was "largely externally driven than internally motivated" and that the organizational culture of utilities was "often slow to accept performance measurement, accountability to customers and to government, and improved service outcomes." Two common indicators of the efficiency of utilities are non-revenue water and labour productivity. According to these indicators, the efficiency of Bangladeshi utilities is poor, despite some recent improvements.

In Dhaka, the share of non-revenue water (NRW) has been substantially reduced from 54% in 2003 to 29% in 2010. Concerning municipalities, the ADB estimates NRW at 33–40%. Labor productity was low, with staffing levels averaging 9 per 1,000 connections and ranging from 7–15 compared to a good practice of less than 5. In 2006–07 the ratio was more than 12 staff per 1,000 connections for Dhaka and 15 in Chittagong.

== Financial aspects ==
=== Tariffs and cost recovery ===
The National Water Master Plan provides for the gradual increase of tariffs to fully recover the costs of service provision in urban areas using an increasing block tariff structure. In rural areas, the tariffs should cover at least all operation and maintenance costs. Since this framework is not yet implemented, municipalities or water utilities have the right to set their own tariffs controlled by the government.

The average tariff in Dhaka was US$0.08 per m^{3} in 2007. Those connected to sewerage had to pay double. Connection fees were between US$29 and US$60, according to the diameter of the pipe. Despite the extremely low tariff, the utility recovered more than its operating cost.

Cost recovery varies between cities. In a sample of 11 utilities, the operating ratio averaged 0.89. In principle, this indicates that on average operating costs were covered, but because of unreliable data it is not sure if this is actually true. The water tariff was on average 4.38 Takas per cubic meter (US$0.06), the lowest one being 2.11 Takas (0.03) in Rajshahi, the highest one being 6.89 Takas (US$0.09) in Chittagong.

Tariffs in rural areas vary. In piped multi-purpose schemes supported by RDA households pay a flat fee equivalent to about US$1.20 per month for drinking water and a flat fee equivalent to US$72/season/hectare for irrigation. Revenues from these tariffs allow to recover operation and maintenance costs.

=== Investment and financing ===
Water and sanitation are not the subject of a separate budget line, but spread over the budgets of different institutions, which makes it difficult to assess how much government funding is spent on water and sanitation, and for what purposes. In the Annual Development Programme (ADP) of the Bangladeshi Planning Commission, the government's development investment in water supply and sanitation ranged between US$50 million and US$101 million from fiscal years 1994–1995 to 2000–2001.

From 1994–1995 to 2000–2001, the water resources subsector, including flood control and irrigation received much more funding than the water supply and sanitation sector, which is shown above. On average, US$74 million or US$0.55 per capita have been spent per year. In 1996–1997, the investment for water resources was more than almost four times as high as the amount provided for water supply and sanitation. From 1973 to 1990, the share of development expenditures for water supply and sanitation decreased gradually in the respective five-year plans. In the first one, it was 2.48% of development investment, dropping to 2.14% and 1.25% in the second and third five-year plans, respectively. In the fourth plan, the allocation increased slightly to 1.41% of the budget.

According to an ADB document comparing water supply in major Asian cities, DWASA's capital expenditure was US$26 million or US$3.51 per user in 2001.

According to an evaluation by the Danish Ministry of Foreign Affairs, 30% of the rural water supply and sanitation in Bangladesh is financed by the national government, whereas 34% comes from bilateral and multilateral donors and another 4% from international and local NGOS. The users contribute the remaining 32%, a remarkable share compared to other countries evaluated in the study, such as Ghana, Egypt or Benin.

Many cities rely on development grants by the central government. In small urban water supply systems, property taxes are used to mobilise local resources. Funding can also be obtained from the Municipal Development Fund. External funding is also common (see section on external donors).

=== Household expenditure for water ===
There are diverse ways in which people value water for different uses compared to other basic goods. Scientists analysed the weekly water expenditure of households living on embanked land in coastal Bangladesh (in Polder 29 which is located in Khulna district in the southwest). They identified five water expenditure typologies:

1. "no expenditure", whereby households mostly depended on pond sand filters, shallow tubewells and rainwater (those incurring no costs might seem to be doing well from an affordability perspective, but do not even have access to basic services in practice);
2. "low regular expenditure" households that purchased 20–60 L of vended water per week and spent about 2%of their total expenditures on water;
3. "high regular expenditure" households that purchased more than 100 L of vended water per week, corresponding to 5% of their total expenditures;
4. "seasonal expenditure" households that purchased vended water regularly during the dry season and subsequently switched to rain-water; and
5. "ad hoc expenditure" households that showed no discernible patterns purchased few containers of vended water when needed, for example, during special occasions.

When accessing water sources and paying for water, households have to consider trade-offs between costs, quality and accessibility, which are in turn mediated by income flows, seasonality, groundwater quality, habits and cultural norms.

== Innovative approaches ==
A number of innovative approaches to improve access to and the sustainability of water supply and sanitation were developed in Bangladesh since the turn of the millennium. These include community-led total sanitation and new management models for piped rural water supply, both further described below.

In addition, innovative pilot projects were initiated in Dhaka. The first provided water to hitherto unserved slum areas through community-based organisations with the assistance of the NGO Dushtha Shasthya Kendra (DSK) and WaterAid from the UK. The second is a pilot for a small-bore sewer system in the Mirpur area of Dhaka with financing from the Asian Development Bank. A third project involved contracting out billing and collection to a woker's cooperative as an alternative to private sector participation.

=== Community-led total sanitation ===
In 2005, the Bangladeshi Minister for Local Government and Rural Development presented a National Sanitation Strategy that ambitiously aimed to reach universal access to sanitation by 2010. Without mentioning community-led total sanitation by name, the strategy incorporates important elements of this approach, such as an emphasis on participation by the whole community and the principle of not subsidising hardware except for the "hardcore poor".

In 2000 a new approach to increasing sanitation coverage, called community-led total sanitation (CLTS), was first introduced in Bangladesh in a small village in the Rajshahi District by Dr. Kamal Kar in co-operation with WaterAid Bangladesh and the Village Education Resource Centre (VERC).

In 2006, the number of villages with total sanitation was estimated at more than 5,000 throughout the country. At the same time, CLTS had spread in at least six countries in Asia and three in Africa.

Community-led total sanitation (CLTS) is a participatory approach used primarily in developing countries to improve sanitation and hygiene practices within communities. CLTS aims to achieve behavior change with a "trigger" that leads to spontaneous and long-term abandonment of open defecation practices, thereby improving community sanitation and overall health. The term "triggering" is central to the CLTS process. It refers to methods of igniting community interest in ending open defecation, usually by building simple toilets such as pit latrines. The effect of CLTS is two-fold: actions that increase self-respect and pride in one's community and actions that promote shame and disgust about one's open defecation behaviors. CLTS takes an approach to rural sanitation that works without hardware subsidies by facilitating communities to acknowledge the problem of open defecation, taking collective action to become "open defecation free," and improve sanitation.

=== New management models for piped rural water supply ===
Deep tubewells with electric pumps are common as source of water supply for irrigation in Bangladesh. The government had long been interested in making the operation of these tubewells more financially viable. One option considered was to increase revenues by selling water from deep tubewells as drinking water and for small-scale commercial operations, thus at the same time addressing the arsenic crisis. Also, the government was interested in developing new management models beyond pure community management to both mobilise funding and improve the quality and sustainability of service provision. To that effect two parallel innovative approaches have been pursued.

==== Rural Development Academy multipurpose schemes ====
These efforts to combine piped drinking water and irrigation schemes were initiated in 1999 by the Rural Development Academy (RDA) with government funds and no donor involvement. RDA invited sponsors and offered to finance the construction of the well and the water supply system under the condition that:

- the sponsors from the community would create a water user association (samitee),
- pay for 10% of the investment costs at the time of completion of the construction,
- operate and maintain the system for 10 years, and
- pay back the remaining 90% of the investment costs over this period.

As of January 2008, 73 small schemes had been completed, both in areas where the shallow aquifer is contaminated by arsenic and those where this is not the case. Sponsors are NGOs, cooperatives or individuals. The number of applicants each year outnumbers the schemes to be constructed. However, tariffs have been set at relatively low levels, so that the operators barely break even and have not paid back the loans for 90% of the investment costs. Revenues from irrigation typically account for a third of the revenues of the water schemes, the remainder coming from the sale of drinking water.

==== Bangladesh Water Supply Program Project ====
Another approach has been supported by the World Bank through the Bangladesh Water Supply Program Project (BWSPP), implemented by the Department of Public Health and Engineering (DPHE). This approach, initiated in 2001, has been inspired by the RDA experience, but with two crucial modifications: First, it required sponsors to come up with the entire financing up-front, which was supposed to be recovered through revenues from the sale of water. Second, only drinking water was to be provided and no irrigation water. Finding sponsors willing to put their own capital at risk proved to be difficult. For this reason, and due to project management difficulties, only two schemes had been built as of January 2008, providing water to 2,000 households. Neither scheme has become financially viable. An NGO built and operates the schemes, since no private company was interested in doing so.

=== Desalination and private water service providers ===
Private water service providers (WSPs) or water enterprises are increasingly offering their services to households. The small companies offer water with drinking water quality that has been treated in reverse osmosis desalination plants, after pumping it from boreholes and desalinating it. Some companies focus on managing distribution vendors. Those vendors collect water from various sources (desalination plants, deep tubewells, pond sand filters etc.) and deliver this water in containers to households by using a variety of vehicles.

For example, in 2021 there were 62 desalination plants in the Paikgacha Upazila, an administrative division with the Khulna District. 53 of those plants are owned and financed by local entrepreneurs. On average one of these desalination plants cost US$7085 (data from 2021). Their capacity is in the range of 360 to 1080 litres per hour. Three factors are thought to have caused this boom in private desalination plants in the area: higher income levels due to export-oriented aquaculture, better access to electricity due to rural electrification, and "the availability of cheaper reverse-osmosis technology imported from China".

If the desalinated water is used for drinking, there is a potential health concern as the desalinated water might well be deficient in minerals. The standard for total dissolved solids (TDS) is 1000 mg/L but desalination delivers water with as low as 40 mg/L TDS unless it is fortified with essential minerals after treatment. Drinking water should contain minimum levels of calcium and magnesium, for example.

=== Professional water service providers for schools ===
The SafePani model began in 2021 as a pilot project in eight unions of Khulna district, It included 171 schools and 33 healthcare facilities, with a total of 294 drinking water points. The concept was to "reallocate service delivery responsibilities from individual schools and healthcare centres to a professional water service provider operating within an exclusive service area". To achieve this, the SafePani model included three areas of activity: Firstly, "rehabilitation and maintenance of all water supply infrastructure". Secondly, "water safety assessment involving sanitary inspection, baseline tests for arsenic, manganese and chloride, and seasonal tests for E. coli". And lastly, "development and maintenance of a data storage platform".

Policy reform has been recommended in 2021 to separate policy, regulation and service delivery for drinking water services at rural schools. These reforms would take place in three areas: institutional design, information systems and sustainable finance.For example, it has been suggested that "professional service delivery models to manage and monitor clusters of schools with a results-based contract will promote more efficient and effective use of resources".

== External co-operation ==
Several external donors have been active in the sector for decades. Concerning urban water supply and sanitation, the Government of Bangladesh and the following donors signed a partnership framework in November 2007: Asian Development Bank (ADB), Danish International Development Assistance (DANIDA), the Government of Japan, the Government of the Republic of Korea, and the World Bank.

The main objectives of the framework are to co-operate to extend the coverage of water, sanitation, wastewater, and drainage services in Dhaka and Chittagong, especially to the poor, and to address long-standing reforms. Under the common partnership framework, all donors carry out individual projects in urban areas. However, the five donors and the Government of Bangladesh have agreed upon general strategies and necessary policy actions as well as an exchange of progress information.

=== Asian Development Bank (ADB) ===
By 2003, the ADB had provided 19 loans amounting to nearly US$700 million in the Bangladeshi water management sector. Under the partnership framework, the bank provides a program loan of US$50 million and a project loan of US$150 million within the Dhaka Water Supply Sector Development Program, approved in April 2008. The former loan aims to support reforms in the urban water supply and sanitation sector, including the strengthening of local institutions and the structure of DWASA, the preparation of a sector strategy and plan and the improving of financial sustainability. The project loan comprises physical investment to rehabilitate and optimise DWASA's distribution network and improve the quality of the services provided, as well as a capacity building and institutional strengthening component, and project management and implementation support. The program and the project, which are both accompanied by technical assistance, are expected to be completed at the end of 2013.

=== Denmark ===
From 1997 to 2009 Danida supported the Coastal Belt which promoted rural and small towns water supply, sanitation and hygiene promotion in the coastal regions of Bangladesh, which built 30,000 arsenic-free deep hand tube wells and promoted the construction of over 300,000 household latrines.

=== World Bank ===
==== Rural areas ====
Bangladesh Water Supply Program Project The World Bank is contributing a US$40 million loan to the Bangladesh Water Supply Program Project, designed to support Bangladesh in achieving the MDGs in water supply and sanitation by 2015 through safe water free from arsenic and pathogens in small towns and rural areas. Private-sector participation in rural areas as well as in municipalities is promoted. In small arsenic-affected villages, measures are introduced to mitigate arsenic. The project is accompanied by a monitoring and evaluation system. Furthermore, adequate regulations, monitoring, capacity building, and training, as well as the development of a local credit market and risk mitigation mechanisms for village piped water supply are supported under the project. It began in 2004 and will likely end in 2010.

Arsenic Mitigation Water Supply Project This project, supported by a US$44.4 million credit and implemented from 1998 to 2006, aimed at "reducing mortality and morbidity in rural and urban populations caused by arsenic contamination of groundwater using sustainable water supply, health, and water management strategies." The project focused primarily on deep tubewells as an alternative to shallow tubewells contaminated with arsenic. It supported the drilling of 9,772 deep tubewells, 300 rainwater harvesting systems and 393 dug wells in more than 1,800 villages, all of which operated and maintained by communities and benefiting between 2 and 2.5 million people. The project was implemented by the Department of Public Health Engineering (DPEH) of MOLGRDC.

==== Urban areas ====
Dhaka Water Supply and Sanitation Project. Under the partnership framework, the World Bank approved in 2008 a US$149 million loan to assist DWASA, the utility serving Dhaka. The project will finance sewers, the rehabilitation and expansion of the Pagla wastewater treatment plant, and stormwater drainage., after a six-year hiatus since the closure of the Fourth Dhaka water supply project.

Fourth Dhaka Water Supply Project The Fourth Dhaka Water Supply Project was carried out from 1996 to 2002. The World Bank contributed US$80.3 million. It was launched to "support institutional reforms in the sector, applying commercial principles and increasing private sector participation". The existing infrastructure was rehabilitated and a water treatment plant was constructed in Saidabad, producing 225 million litres per day. Private sector participation and the application of commercial principles were limited to the introduction of outsourcing of billing and collection in two revenue zones. Furthermore, a managing director with a private sector background was appointed to manage DWASA.

The Chittagong water supply and sanitation improvement project, a US$170 million loan approved in 2010, supports the construction of two water treatment plants and water distribution systems in Chittagong.

== See also ==
- Water management in Dhaka
