= Water management in Dhaka =

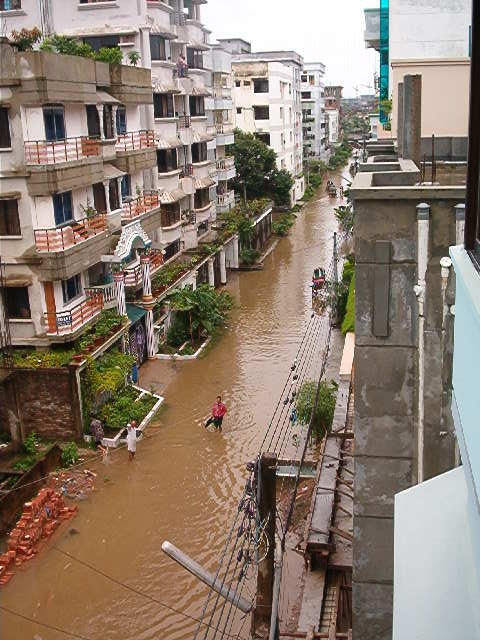
A street in Dhaka during a flood in 2004

Water management in Dhaka faces numerous challenges such as flooding, poor service quality, groundwater depletion, inadequate sanitation, polluted river water, unplanned urban development, and the existence of large slums. Residents of Dhaka have one of the lowest water tariffs in the world, which limits the utility's capacity to invest. The utility in charge of water and sanitation in Dhaka, Dhaka WASA, addresses these challenges with a number of measures.

Dhaka WASA said in 2011 that it achieved a continuous water supply 24 hours per day 7 days a week, an increase in revenues so that operating costs are more than covered, and a reduction of water losses from 53% in 2003 to 29% in 2010. In the future, DWASA plans massive investment to replace dwindling groundwater resources with treated surface water from less polluted rivers located up to 160 km from the city. In 2011, Bangladesh's capital development authority, Rajdhani Unnayan Kartripakkha, made rainwater harvesting for new houses mandatory in an effort to address water scarcity and reduce flooding.

== History ==
The first piped drinking water system in Dhaka was established in 1874 by Khwaja Abdul Ghani, the aristocrat that ruled Dhaka under the British colonial authorities. The system was fed by a water treatment plant in Chadnighat near the bank of the river Buriganga. After independence from the British, in 1948 the Department of Public Health Engineering of the Pakistani government was in charge of drinking water supply as well as sanitary sewers and storm-water drainage. Dhaka WASA (Water Supply & Sewerage Authority) was established in 1963. In 1989, the storm-water drainage system of Dhaka city was handed over to DWASA. In 1990, the service area was extended to include Narayanganj city. In the early 1990s, the World Bank had said it would only provide a loan for water supply in Dhaka if the utility would enter into a public-private partnership with an international water company. When this was rejected, it asked that revenue billing and collection should be outsourced to a private company for at least one service area on a pilot basis, and that DWASA should be transformed into a commercially oriented utility. The outsourcing in one service area was done in 1997, but the pilot project was not deemed successful and was stopped. DWASA's activities have been reorganised by the Dhaka WASA Act, 1996, which transformed DWASA into a service-oriented commercial organisation.

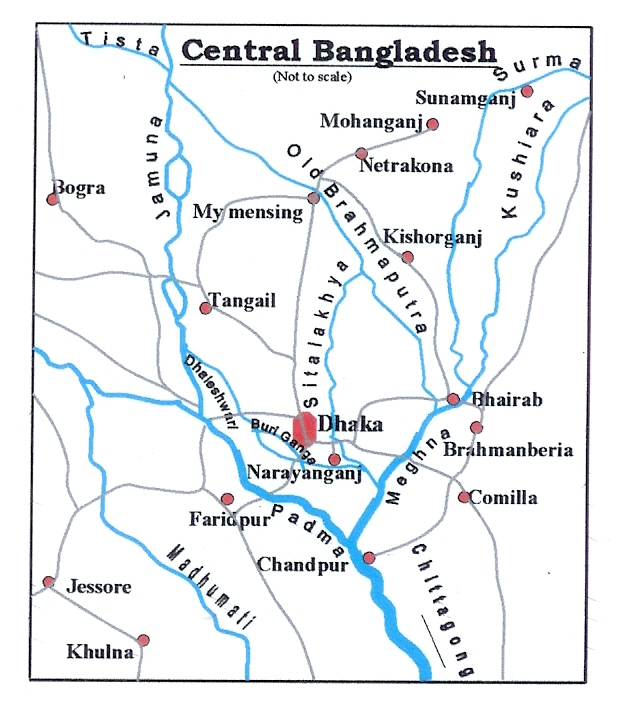
Dhaka lies on the banks of the Buriganga River in central Bangladesh.

== Service area ==
The service area of DWASA covers more than 360 square km, with a population of about 12 million. It extends from Mirpur and Uttara in the North to Narayanganj in the South. The Buriganga River and many canals flow through the city. Tropical vegetation and moist soil characterise the land, which is flat. The elevation of Greater Dhaka is 2 to 13 meters above the mean sea level, and most of the urbanised areas are at elevations of 6 to 8 metres. This leaves Dhaka susceptible to flooding during the monsoon seasons owing to heavy rainfall and cyclones.

== Challenges ==
Water management in Dhaka faces numerous challenges such as flooding, poor service quality, groundwater depletion, inadequate sanitation, polluted river water, unplanned urban development, and the existence of large slums where more than one third of its population lives. Every year during the dry season, people demonstrate in Dhaka's streets, demanding an uninterrupted supply of clean water. In 2010, Bangladesh's government had to even deploy troops to guard water pumps following angry protests.

=== Flooding ===
Bangladesh has been repeatedly exposed to severe flooding. Dhaka was particularly hit by the floods of 1970, 1974, 1980, 1987, 1988, 1996, 1998, 2004, 2007 and 2009, some of which, such as the ones in 1988 and 1998, were catastrophic with flood levels of up to 4.5m in parts of the city. During the 1998 flood, about 56 percent of the city was inundated, including most of the eastern and 23 percent of the western parts of the city. During non-catastrophic floods, some streets are inundated for up to 60 cm for several days. Flooding in Dhaka is caused by high rainfall in the city and/or by flooding from the surrounding rivers and canals. The western and most densely settled part of Dhaka is protected from river flooding by raised roads and an encircling embankment built after the 1988 flood. The eastern part of the city where most of the expansion takes place consists of low-lying floodplains that are submerged during the monsoon season. When high rainfall coincides with a high water level in the river, stormwater cannot be naturally evacuated through the drainage system. Retention areas are supposed to mitigate flooding, and pumping stations have been set up to evacuate floodwater. However, encroachment of natural runoff detention areas, lack of maintenance of storm sewers and pumps, and a lack of co-ordination among responsible organisations hamper efforts at flood management. Four organisations are in charge of various aspects of stormwater management in Dhaka: The Bangladesh Water Development Board (BWDB) is in charge of operating regulators and gates in the embankment; DWASA is in charge of the larger open drainage canals and pipes; Dhaka City Corporation (DCC) operates smaller underground and surface drains; and the Capital Development Authority (RAJUK) constructs underground roadside drainage lines during the construction of new roads. Stormwater pumping stations of various sizes are operated by BWDB, DWASA and the Dkaha City Corporation. After the catastrophic 1998 flood caused by high river levels, it turned out that there was neither an operating policy nor person assigned to operate an important regulator, the Rampura Regulator. Many gates that were supposed to be closed to keep the water from the rising rivers out had not been closed. Furthermore, in 2002 it was noted that the existing earthen embankment was unstable and cracking in large sections. Also, construction of embankments through low-lying areas without providing adequate drainage facilities had caused internal flooding.

=== Poor service quality ===
According to background information for a representative survey conducted for the Asian Development Bank in 2005, out of the 12 million inhabitants of Dhaka, the Dhaka water utility provided drinking water for 9 million through house connections, as well as for an additional 600,000 through 1700 standpipes and 100,000 through bulk connections. Bulk connections are located in slums and are known as "Water Points". NGOs are responsible for the installation, operation, maintenance as well as collection of revenues from these connections. Only 39% of the residential customers surveyed reported having a continuous water supply. On average, customers received water 15 hours per day. 75% of residential and 85% of non-residential customers reported that they had water storage facilities at their premises. 62% of residential customers reported their water quality as good or fair, i.e., not smelly or dirty. Only 10% of residential customers reported drinking water directly from the tap. By far the most common treatment method was boiling. 75% of the domestic and 64% of the non-domestic households were willing to pay more for better services.

The authors of the survey note a number of discrepancies between utility data and the results of the survey. The utility indicated at the time that 70% of its customers had continuous supply, that 63% had meters and that 97% of meters were in working condition. However, the survey indicated that 42% had continuous supply, that 76% were metered, and that only 77% of meters were in working condition.

=== Groundwater overexploitation ===
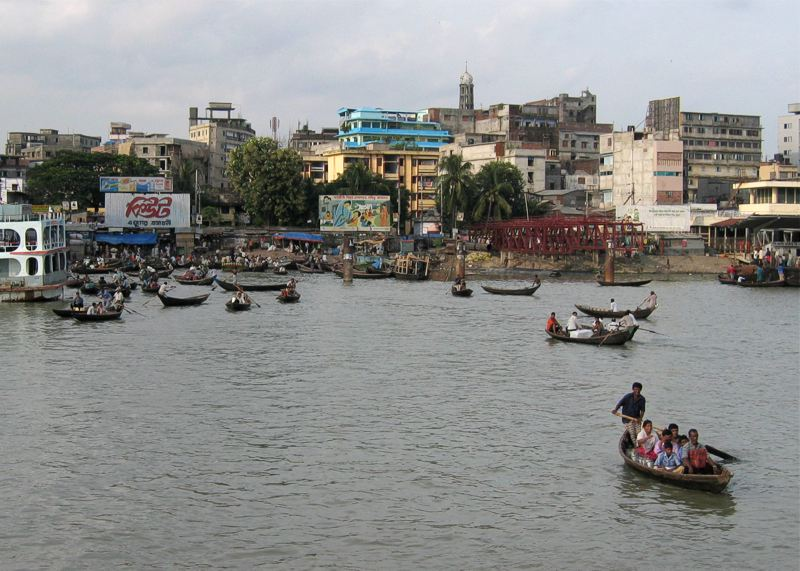
Although Dhaka is located on the banks of the Buriganga River, only 18% of its drinking water supply comes from surface water because it is highly polluted.

82% of the city's water supply is abstracted from groundwater through 577 deep tube wells, while four relatively small surface water treatment plants provide the remaining 18%. Groundwater levels are dropping two to three metres every year. The city's water table has sunk by 50 metres in the past four decades, and the closest underground water is now over 60 meters below ground level. The Asian Development Bank estimated in 2007 that by 2015 a severe supply shortage would occur if the utility did not reduce groundwater abstraction. Nevertheless, DWASA announced in 2012 that it will develop a new wellfield with 46 wells providing 150,000 cubic meters of water per day at a cost of US$63 million, of which US$45 million will be financed by the government of South Korea.

=== Inadequate sanitation ===
In Dhaka, nearly one-third of domestic effluents do not receive any kind of treatment. About 38% of the population is covered by a sewerage system. There is one wastewater treatment plant with a capacity of 120,000 m^{3} per day. About 30% of the population uses conventional septic tanks, and another 15% uses bucket and pit latrines. During the rainy season, sewage overflows are common.

== Other issues ==
=== Low tariffs and cost recovery ===
Residents of Dhaka enjoy one of the lowest water tariffs in the world. The Executive Head of DWASA lists provision of water at low cost as one of the achievements of the utility. However, low revenues limit the utility's capacity to make a higher contribution to investments.

According to DWASA's official website, in November 2011 the metered residential tariff was 6.6 Taka (US$0.09) per cubic meter. For households with sewer connections the tariff was 15.5 Taka (US$0.21) per cubic meter. Unmetered residential water connections were billed 128 Takas (US$1.72) per month. The commercial, industrial and institutional tariffs are more than three times higher. Total revenues were the equivalent of about US$70 million per annum in 2010 and, according to DWASA management, cover about 25% more than the operating costs of the utility (operating ratio of 0.79).

However, a recent study shows that for domestic water use slum dwellers in Dhaka Metropolitan Area are paying about 7 to 14 times higher than the legal connection holders covered by DWASA. Slum dwellers are spending about 12 to 15% of their average monthly income for domestic water supply, whereas in most of the countries, legal connection holders are spending less than 5% of their average monthly income for the same purpose.

=== Overstaffing ===
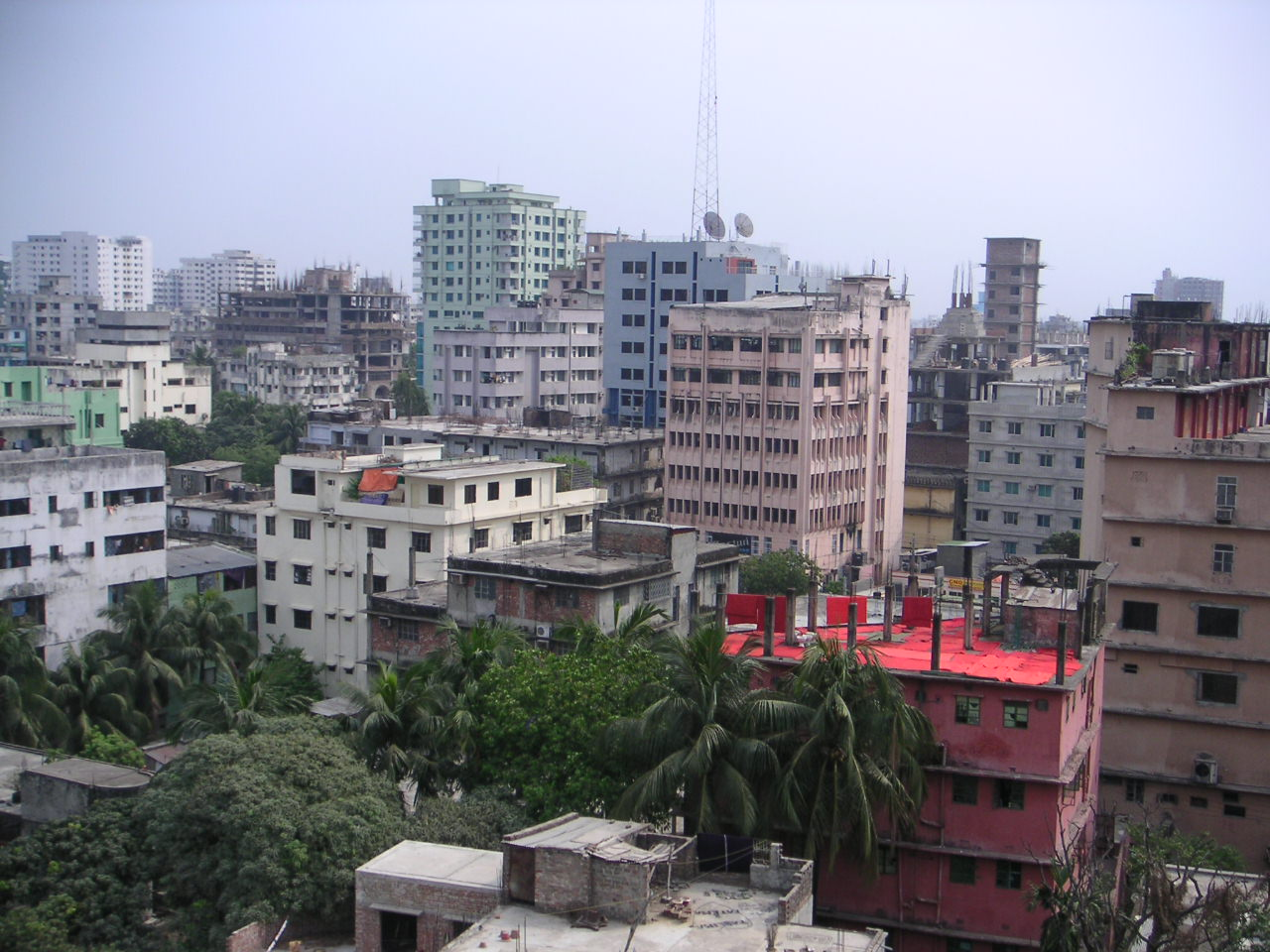
In Dhaka a single water connection often serves an entire high-rise building.

A common indicator of whether water utilities are overstaffed is the ratio of employees per 1,000 connections. Using this indicator, DWASA appears to be overstaffed: According to DWASA, the utility had 3,566 employees and served 325,717 connections in 2013, resulting in 10.9 employees per 1,000 connections. This figure is 30% higher than the average of 18 major Asian cities, which was 8.3 in 2001 according to the Asian Development Bank. However, in Dhaka there are more than 40 inhabitants per connection, an unusually high ratio. Thus, for a city of 12 million the utility is not necessarily overstaffed. For example, the city of Berlin, Germany, also had 3,948 employees in 2009, but served less than 4 million people. Given low salaries in Bangladesh, it is also appropriate to use more labour-intensive approaches than in richer countries, and the staffing level should thus probably not be considered to be overly high.

== Achievements and response to challenges ==
In 2010 the Dhaka water utility, DWASA, embarked on a "Turnaround Plan" for the period 2010–12. The Turnaround Plan includes capacity building, more transparency and accountability, and better customer orientation. According to the Executive Head of DWASA, as of early 2011 achievements are a continuous water supply 24 hours per day 7 days a week, an increase in revenues so that operating costs are more than covered, and a reduction of water losses. For these achievements DWASA, got a "Performer of the Year Award" at the Global Water Summit 2011 in Berlin, an event organised by an industry magazine. The award selection was made by participants based on presentations by the managers of seven invited utilities from Algeria, Bangladesh, Brazil, Poland, Romania and the United States.

=== Water loss reduction ===
In Dhaka, the share of non-revenue water (NRW), water which is not billed, e.g., due to leakage and illegal connections, has been reduced substantially. According to DWASA, system losses have been reduced from 36% in 2007–08 to 27% in 2012–13. Their goal is to continue reducing system loss by two percent per year. The average level of NRW in 17 other major Asian cities, as estimated by the ADB in 2004, was 34%.

=== Improved billing and customer service ===
DWASA introduced a computerised billing system including the ability of customers to pay bills via SMS. Through this system and other measures revenues increased by 20% in a year and a half from 2009 on, while tariffs went up by only about 5% in July 2010.

DWASA has eleven revenue zones. It sets a zone-wide annual target for billing, collection and reduction of non-revenue water. In at least three revenue zones utility staff are in charge of billing and collection directly, while in the other revenue zones this is done by an employees' cooperative, the Employees' Consumers Supplies Cooperative Society Ltd. (ECSCSL), under contract with the utility. Most of the workers at ECSCSL are seconded from Dhaka WASA. They receive salaries that are up to three times higher than at Dhaka WASA. Non-performing employees can be sent back to Dhaka WASA and ECSCSL can recruit new employees on its own. Workers also undertake water connections in informal houses, which Dhaka WASA rules do not normally permit.

The system was introduced in 1997 in the context of privatisation efforts (see history section) which were opposed by employees. It was thus decided that one zone would be privatised and another one would be given to the employees' cooperative, experimentally, for one year. The private company and ECSCSL started in September 1997. In 1998 a monitoring committee found that ECSCSL had out-performed the private company in revenue collection increases and non-revenue water reductions. Subsequently, Dhaka WASA asked ECSCSL to take over two more of its revenue zones. The cooperative made sure that consumers receive bills monthly rather than bimonthly. The Cooperative has met its contractual targets every year. However, an independent study conducted in 2004 found that Dhaka WASA tends to choose deliberately low financial targets in the Cooperative zones. Moreover, the cost of revenue collection in the cooperative zones has almost doubled.

=== Reaching the poor ===
A project provided water to hitherto unserved slum areas through community-based organisations with the assistance of the NGO Dushtha Shasthya Kendra (DSK) and WaterAid from the UK. Initially the utility refused to provide water connections, saying that slum dwellers would not be able or not be willing to pay water bills. DSK, which knew the community-based organisations in the slums well due to its previous work on health issues there, gave financial guarantees in case the community failed to pay. On that basis, the utility provided water points. The communities paid their bills on time, so that the guarantee never had to be called. From 2008 onwards, the utility provided water points to the slums without requiring a guarantee.

A pilot project for a small-bore sewer system in the Mirpur area of Dhaka was implemented several years ago, with financing from the Asian Development Bank. This scheme was never commissioned and is now completely non-functional.

== Plans ==
=== Developing surface water ===
The utility plans to substitute surface water for groundwater through the construction of four large water treatment plants until 2020 at a cost of US$1.8bn (Saidabad Phase II and III, Padma/Pagla and Khilkhet). The treatment plants will draw water from more distant and less polluted rivers up to 160 km from the city. The four plants are expected to have a combined capacity of 1.63 million cubic meters per year, compared to a 2010 supply of 2.11 million cubic meter per year that is mainly from groundwater. As of 2011, funding had been secured for the first plant which is under construction thanks to a US$250 million contribution from Danish development assistance. In 2012 the government signed a contract with a Chinese company to build a water treatment plant at Munshiganj on the Padma River. The project costs US$407 million, of which US$290.8 million is financed by a soft loan from the Chinese government, the remainder coming from the Bangladeshi government.

=== Promotion of rainwater harvesting ===
To alleviate the water scarcity, in 2011 the city of Dhaka announced it would amend its building code to require rooftop rainwater harvesting systems in new buildings. The measure aims to address the city's worsening water shortages and curb drops in groundwater levels. Collecting rainwater also will help avoid flooding problems in Dhaka during the monsoon season.

== Corporate governance ==
DWASA is under the authority of the Ministry of Local Government, Rural Development and Cooperatives. DWASA's Board consists of 13 members and is chaired by a customer representative. The Ministry is represented by a Joint Secretary from the Local Government Division. Two board members are appointed by the municipal authority and one by the Minister of Finance. The Executive Head of DWSASA is also an ex officio member of the Board. Other Board members are appointed by professional associations and the Chamber of Commerce and Industry.

== See also ==
- Water supply and sanitation in Bangladesh
