= Mercy Relief =

Singaporean humanitarian organization

- Founded: 12 May 2001
- Founders: Perdaus
- Purpose: Humanitarian aid, disaster relief
- Location: Singapore
- Region served: Asia
- Website: Organisation website

Mercy Relief is a non-governmental humanitarian organisation based in Singapore. It was established in 2001 by Perdaus, a Malay-Muslim organization and became the first Muslim organisation in Singapore with a disaster humanitarian relief wing. The organization was officially launched on 12 May 2001 by Abdullah Tarmugi, then-Minister for Community Development and Sports and Minister-in-charge of Muslim Affairs. In September 2003, the organisation was strategically launched by then-Deputy Prime Minister of Singapore, Lee Hsien Loong, as an independent charitable nongovernmental humanitarian organisation and conferred the Institute of Public Character (IPC) status.

== History ==
Officially launched in 2003, Mercy Relief is Singapore's only independent non-governmental organization involved in humanitarian disaster relief. In December 2003, Mercy Relief was granted the Institution of Public Character (IPC) Status.

The charity's first response since its official launch was to Bohorok River flash floods in North Sumatra in 2003, followed by the earthquake in Bam, Iran in the same year. The next year, Mercy Relief was awarded the annual Singapore International Foundation Award for its efforts in spreading the Singaporean spirit in 11 countries through its works.

Mercy Relief was invited by United Nations in 2008 to speak at the International Disaster and Risk Conference, on "Peace-time strategies that can ease relief operations and the management of risks during and after such calamities".

In 2009, Singapore observed its inaugural World Humanitarian Day, where the works and sacrifices of humanitarians, including Mercy Relief's, was commemorated. It then partnered with Singapore Polytechnic in 2010 to conduct a two-year diploma-plus certificate course in humanitarian affairs.

Mercy Relief also hosted Singapore's president, President Tony Tan Keng Yam at a humanitarian assistance project site in Magelang, Indonesia in 2012. In that same year, it participated in the Singapore National Day Parade for the first time, as part of the marching contingent.

=== 2018 Kerala floods ===
Following intense flooding in Kerala in 2018, Mercy Relief dispatched a disaster response team to the Ernakulam and Alappuzha districts. The team provided 400 relief kits including basic food and hygiene items and restored 36 household water wells. The efforts were made possible with Rapid Response and SG$17,000 relief funds raised from the public.

=== 2017 Rohingya aid ===
Working with the Singapore Armed Forces, Mercy Relief brought essential supplies worth SG$270,000 to Bangladesh and delivered them to Rohingya in Cox's Bazar.

=== 2016 Aceh earthquake ===
A 6.5-magnitude earthquake has struck Aceh in 2016, which displaced more than 11,000 people, left 104 deceased and at least 1,200 injured.

Mercy Relief responded to the disaster by deploying a two-man disaster response team to assess the needs of the community on the ground and coordinate disaster relief efforts.

=== 2015 Nepal earthquake ===
During the post-disaster phase of the April 2015 Nepal earthquake, Mercy Relief managed to raised SG$750,000 to help victims, of which $60,000 went to support acute relief effort. It has also launched fundraising campaigns and raised over SG$30,000. And Singapore Civil Defence Force, where volunteers cycled for 10 hours on 6 water filtration bicycles to raise funds for the victims in Nepal.

Mercy Relief also undertook reconstruction projects to provide a secure roof for quake survivors and temporary structures to be used as a school before the onset of the monsoon. Using public donations, it put up 510 shelters, providing shelter to individuals during the monsoon season. The next phase focused on permanent shelter reconstruction after the monsoon passes. In total, about $1.5 million of funds were raised to provide acute relief and reconstruction efforts.

Up till 28 April 2015, the team has done 27 relief distribution and 8 medical missions, helping individuals living in the rural regions of Kathmandu and other areas of Nepal and about 20,000 beneficiaries.

=== 2014 Gaza conflict ===
Amidst the 2014 Gaza conflict, Mercy Relief contributed SG$400,000 worth of aid, of which SG$250,000 was distributed as an initial tranche. It also provided SG$60,000 worth of food aid, SG$100,000 worth of medical supplies, and a fully equipped ambulance, which will be deployed by its Palestinian partner agency.

=== 2013 Typhoon Haiyan ===
In 2013, Typhoon Haiyan swept the Philippines and Mercy Relief raised SG$1.16 million from public donations to help individuals affected by the typhoon. The donations were channelled to mainly funding health-care missions and rebuilding efforts. Besides fundraising, Mercy Relief focused on providing acute emergency relief and gathering relief supplies from neighbouring, less affected areas. It dispatched teams to provinces devastated by the typhoon, helping about 25,000 people.

=== 2011 Japan earthquake and tsunami ===
Following the 2011 Tōhoku earthquake and tsunami, Mercy Relief raised SG$2.6 million for victims, where they spent on operations and logistics, buying essentials and radioactive protective suits for survivors. It camped out in disaster-stricken regions in Japan for 5 months, pumped SG$2.8 million to help victims of the disaster. This included distributing 5000 winter blankets in Ishinomaki, a city located in Miyagi.

Mercy Relief, with the help of a Japanese volunteer, implemented the Tohoku Livelihood and Recovery program, an 8-month program which trains individuals to operate heavy machinery. The program benefited 300 farming and fishing communities across Iwate, Miyagi and Fukushima. And following the program, 832 Japanese were trained to operate heavy machinery, allowing them to help in decontamination works, removing debris left behind by the earthquake.

=== 2010 Pakistan flood ===
The 2010 Pakistan floods happened in late July due to heavy monsoon rains that affected the Indus River basin. As a result of the flood, about 20% of Pakistan's total land area was submerged. The floods killed close to 2000 people, and directly affected approximately 20 million people were affected.

In response to the flood, Mercy Relief sent disaster relief teams and has helped raise $509,000 to provide relief aid and supplies to the flood victims. It also distributed ultra-filtration systems, food and tents for residents. Realising a shortage of medical services, Mercy Relief partnered with SingHealth and South City Hospital in Pakistan, where a medical mission team was sent to aid residents living in that region.

=== 2008 Sichuan earthquake ===
The 2008 Sichuan earthquake was an 8.0 magnitude earthquake, which happened on 12 May 2008. It killed 69,197 people and left 18,222 people missing.

Mercy Relief responded to the 2008 Sichuan earthquake, which killed almost 90,000 people and affected a population of 11 million. It was the first foreign group to deliver essentials such as toothpaste and milk powder amounting to $50,000 to Lushan, the southwestern part of Sichuan. Apart from helping the Lushan community, Mercy Relief also helped individuals in Baoxing, where they supported in the provision of relief supplies, worth $250,000.

Back home in Singapore, Mercy Relief have raised over $1.1 million. More than half of the amount was used for the reconstruction of two rural schools.

=== 2004 Indian Ocean earthquake and tsunami ===
The 2004 Indian Ocean earthquake, also known as the Sumatra-Andaman earthquake, happened on 26 December 2004 and resulted in a tsunami which killed 230,000 people in 14 countries.

Following the tsunami, Mercy Relief raised $1.1 million, spending on supplies for the victims. Apart from raising funds, Mercy Relief managed food relief packages, food and water donations. It also sent two teams to Sri Lanka and Aceh to help with post-disaster work. In Aceh, it spearheaded a S$2 million housing project, building proper housing for 900 victims of the tsunami, and donated fishing boats to the locals. Mercy Relief also took on a US$3 million project to rebuild the only hospital in Meulaboh, West Aceh that was struck by the tsunami, as well as other school and orphanage building projects.

=== Ground Zero – Run for Humanity 2015 ===
On 10 October 2015, Mercy Relief organized Singapore's first humanitarian-themed charity race in Singapore, Ground Zero, Run for Humanity. The run garnered 1,100 participants and saw some 500 participants carrying a 5 kg relief pack while completing a 5 km Relief Aid Challenge, mimicking the experiences of victims in natural disasters. Attendees of the event include Minister of Environment and Water Resources, Masagos Zulkifli.
