= International Medical Relief =

US-based non-governmental organization

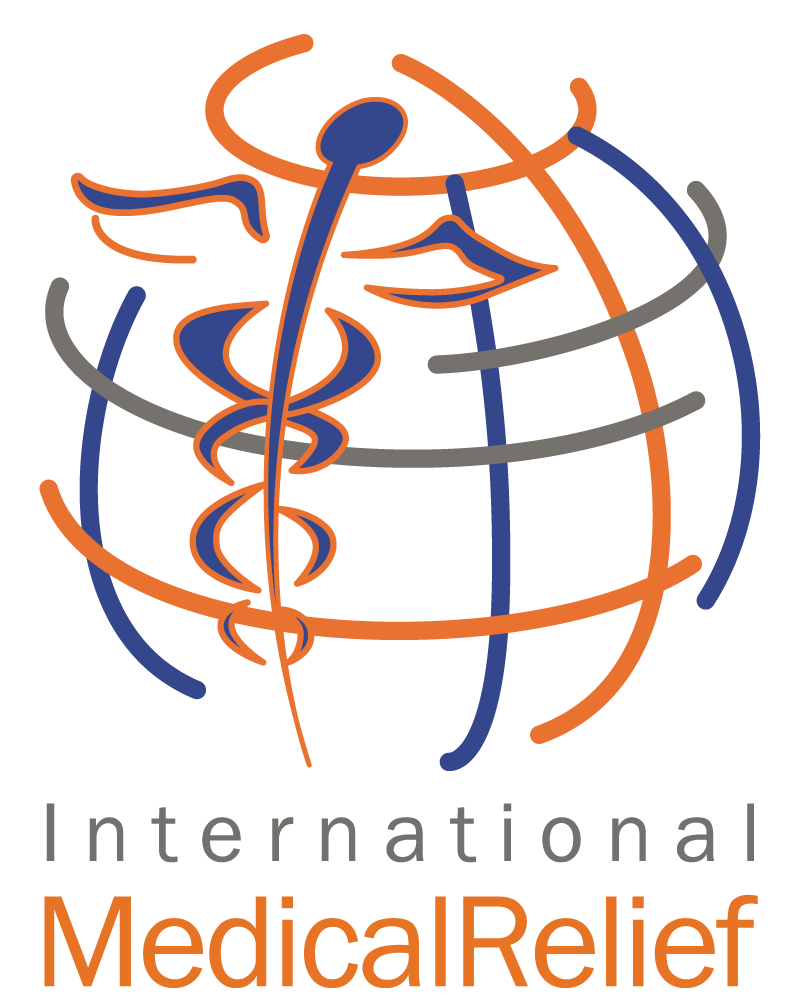
- Abbreviation: IMR
- Founded: 2002
- Founder: Shauna Vollmer King
- Type: INGO
- Legal status: 501(c)(3) nonprofit
- Purpose: International medical and health organizations Emergency Medicine
- Location: Denver, Colorado
- Region served: Worldwide
- Revenue: $65 million
- Volunteers: 60,000
- Website: internationalmedicalrelief.org

International Medical Relief (IMR) is a non-governmental organization (NGO) headquartered in Colorado, United States. Its primary objective is to offer healthcare services to marginalized and underserved populations worldwide. IMR achieves this by enlisting healthcare professionals and volunteer doctors who donates their time and expertise.

The organization specializes in providing medical aid during both domestic and international emergencies, deploying first responder medical teams to swiftly address the healthcare needs of affected communities. IMR's primary focus is to provide rapid and effective healthcare assistance to those in need.

== Background and current operations ==
International Medical Relief was founded in 2002 by Shauna Vollmer King on the belief that healthcare should not be the prerogative of select nations and regions, or classes. It should be given to all who need it. IMR enhances health care for underdeveloped communities through services provided in collaboration with doctors and professional partners. IMR provides free health care services, and supplies to communities who are poor, ill and sick, and have any kind of disease. IMR begins each clinic with team members to foster community development and interaction and to proceed through pre-arranged logistics.

Mission

International Medical Relief (IMR) is a nonprofit organization that provides healthcare services and health education programs in underserved communities worldwide. The organization conducts medical missions, supports public health initiatives, and offers training programs for healthcare professionals and community members.

Operations

International Medical Relief helps in the well-being of communities that are underdeveloped through needed services provided by doing a collaboration with partners.

Health Care Services

IMR provides free healthcare medicines, services, and as well as supplies to underserved communities, especially to the communities of sick, frail, and poor people who are at a major risk of illness, poor health, and different diseases. To foster the interaction of community and as well as development. IMR starts each clinic with the help of team members and introduces them to other members and community leaders.

Sustainable Community Health Education

IMR's each clinic includes basic health education according to the specialties and skills of the IMR volunteers, as well as the needs of the local people. When communities become empowered to take health and wellness issues into their own hands, they become self-sufficient. IMR provides learning opportunities for the local communities through classes and hands-on learning to sustain their well-being beyond a visit.

== Current operations ==
International Medical Relief works in 78 countries in Africa, Pan-American, Asia, Europe, and the Middle East, providing medical relief, education, and disaster response. International Medical Relief ensures that specific goals are met on their missions, each in correlation to the United Nations Sustainable Development Goals.

== Disaster response ==
International Medical Relief has conducted disaster relief responses in over 19 countries, with a team that includes EMTs, doctors, nurses, dentists, and students. These teams reach beyond borders to initiate critical care to the most affected communities. IMR has responded to earthquakes, hurricanes, tsunamis, typhoons, cyclones, and volcano eruptions. International Medical Relief has also provided disaster relief for people impacted by the following earthquakes: 2008 China earthquake, 2010 Chile earthquake, 2010 Haiti earthquake, April 2015 Nepal earthquake, 2018 Indonesia Lombok earthquake, 2018 Haiti earthquake, and the April 2015 Nepal earthquake. International Medical Relief has provided a response to the following hurricanes: 2019 Hurricane Dorian Bahamas, 2017 Hurricane Maria Puerto Rico, and 2016 Hurricane Otto Nicaragua. Other disaster response efforts include 2004 Banda Aceh Tsunami, 2008 Cyclone Nargis Myanmar, 2011 Libya Civil conflict, 2013 Typhoon Haiyan Philippines, the 2016 Congo Famine, the 2015 Ethiopia droughts, the 2016 Syrian refugee crisis in Greece, 2018 Volcano Fuego eruption in Guatemala and COVID-19 virus pandemic.
