= Lamia Afghan Foundation =

US non-profit organization

The Lamia Afghan Foundation is a charitable, 501(c)(3) tax-exempt organization based in Tennessee, that provides humanitarian aid to children and families in Afghanistan. Its work has included school construction, girls' education programs, vocational training, hospital support, and humanitarian aid shipments. Although founded in 2008, the foundation's origins come from an organization named Operation Care, which was formed in 2003 by US service personnel in Afghanistan who dedicated their free time and labor to collect and distribute aid to Afghan families, with a particular focus on children.

The Lamia Afghan Foundation (LAF) was formed to provide a sustainable means to collect and organize shipment of aid from various locations to Afghanistan, where it is distributed directly to those in need by US and Coalition Forces. As of January, 2009, LAF has collected over 140,000 pounds of supplies for distribution, including: neo-natal supplies (mother and baby formula), medical supplies, school supplies, clothes and shoes, building supplies, and other necessities such as blankets. In addition, the foundation goals include trying to provide a means for the next generation of Afghans to be able to help themselves through mechanisms such as micro loans, partnering US towns and schools with counterparts in Afghanistan, and through focused donations of items such as building supplies, sewing machines, and farming supplies. As part of its charter, LAF also provides basic necessities to the coalition forces responsible for distributing the aid.

The Lamia Afghan Foundation collects donations through periodic drives in selected U.S. cities where collection points are advertised ahead of time, in coordination with local community organizations, and/or in partnership with other aid or charitable organizations.

== Activities ==
By 2013, John and Jan Bradley had made several trips to Afghanistan through the foundation, which had built schools and delivered more than two million pounds of supplies. In 2022, World Food Program USA named the Lamia Afghan Foundation as one of three Catherine Bertini Trust Fund for Girls' Education grantees, supporting its home-school model for girls in Jalalabad.
