= Lux-Development =

LuxDev
- Founded: 1978
- Headquarters: Luxembourg, Luxembourg
- Services: development cooperation
- Number of employees: 644 (as of 31 December 2024)
- Website: luxdev.lu

Lux-Development S.A., better known as LuxDev, is the Luxembourg Development Cooperation Agency.

It was created in 1978 as an agency to support small and medium enterprises in Luxembourg and only became an agency for development cooperation in 1992. Now, LuxDev is a société anonyme (S.A.) whereby their stockholders are the state of Luxembourg (98%) and the state-owned bank Société Nationale de Crédit et d'Investissement (2%).

LuxDev is headquartered next to the Place des Martyrs in Luxembourg City, but it has country and regional offices in Pristina (Kosovo), Dakar (Senegal), Praia (Cape Verde), Ouagadougou (Burkina Faso), Bamako (Mali), Kigali (Rwanda), Cotonou (Benin), Vientiane (Laos), and San Jose (Costa Rica).

== Mission ==
LuxDev handles almost all of the resources allocated by the government of Luxembourg to bilateral official development assistance. It can however also execute programmes financed by other bilateral donors and the European Commission.

== Field of activity ==
The Agency focuses on projects in the following areas: Agriculture, Forestry and Fishery, Digitalisation and ICT, Education, Vocational Training and Employment, Environment and Climate Change, Governance, Health, Impact Finance, Socio-Economic Development, and Water and Sanitation.

Projects and programmes are implemented in Benin, Burkina Faso, Cape Verde, Cambodia, Costa Rica, DR Congo, El Salvador, Laos, Mali, Mongolia, Kosovo, Rwanda, Senegal, Togo, Ukraine and Vietnam.

== Numbers and facts ==
In 2024 LuxDev managed 89 projects and programmes and disbursed a total amount of 144,364,226 euros.

The Agency was certified ISO 9001:2000 in 2005.

== See also ==
- List of development aid agencies
