= Artists for Charity =

Ethiopian humanitarian organization

- Formation: 2002; 24 years ago
- Type: Non-governmental organization
- Purpose: Raising awareness and securing funds for humanitarian causes
- Location: Georgia, United States
- Region served: Ethiopia
- Website: artistsforcharity.org

Artists for Charity is a 501(c)3 non-profit organization founded in 2002. The organization is made up of artists and individuals who volunteer and donate their artwork to raise awareness and provide funding to humanitarian causes in Ethiopia.

== History ==
The organization was founded by Ethiopian-American artist Abezash Tamerat and her husband Million Fikre, an advisor for the World Bank. Tamerat moved to the United States when she was eight years old. She was inspired to found the organization after returning to visit Ethiopia as an adult in 2004. Tamerat later moved back to Addis Ababa to live full time.

== Operations ==
The organization raises awareness of humanitarian issues using social media and by hosting events like holiday benefits.

=== Artists for Charity Children's Home ===
The Artists for Charity Children’s Home, located in Addis Ababa, provides care for 16 children that have lost both parents to HIV/AIDS. The AFC Children’s Home includes a dormitory bedroom, 2 kitchens, dining room, medicine room, and study room. In order to ensure proper medical care, a nurse oversees the medicine dosing regimen and attends to minor illnesses and non-emergency first aid details. Because of the immune-suppressed status of the children, a sterile environment is maintained as much as possible. AFC ensures that all living arrangements are provided, including supplying clothing, toiletries, personal items, beds, bedclothes, transportation costs, school costs and supplies, medical appointments, and medicines.

The criteria for accepting children to the AFC home are:

- HIV positive children between the ages of 8 and 15, and
- Children who have been orphaned by both parents.
- Children in extenuating circumstances, such as extreme impoverishment or abuse (physical, sexual, or mental), regardless of age.
