= Afghan German Management College =

Non-governmental organization

The Afghan German Management College (AGMC) was a German-Afghan NGO. It was established at the beginning of 2006 in the German city of Koblenz. Until 2007 this institution was known under the name of Afghan Business School. The AGMC offered management knowledge in English language for students in Afghanistan. The lectures were taught via distant-learning. As of 2012, the college was in the process of ceasing operations.

== Organisation ==
The college was headed by the Founder and President Bastian Kuhl. Dr. Andreas Philipp was the scientific counselor.
