= Aid agency =

Organization dedicated to distributing aid

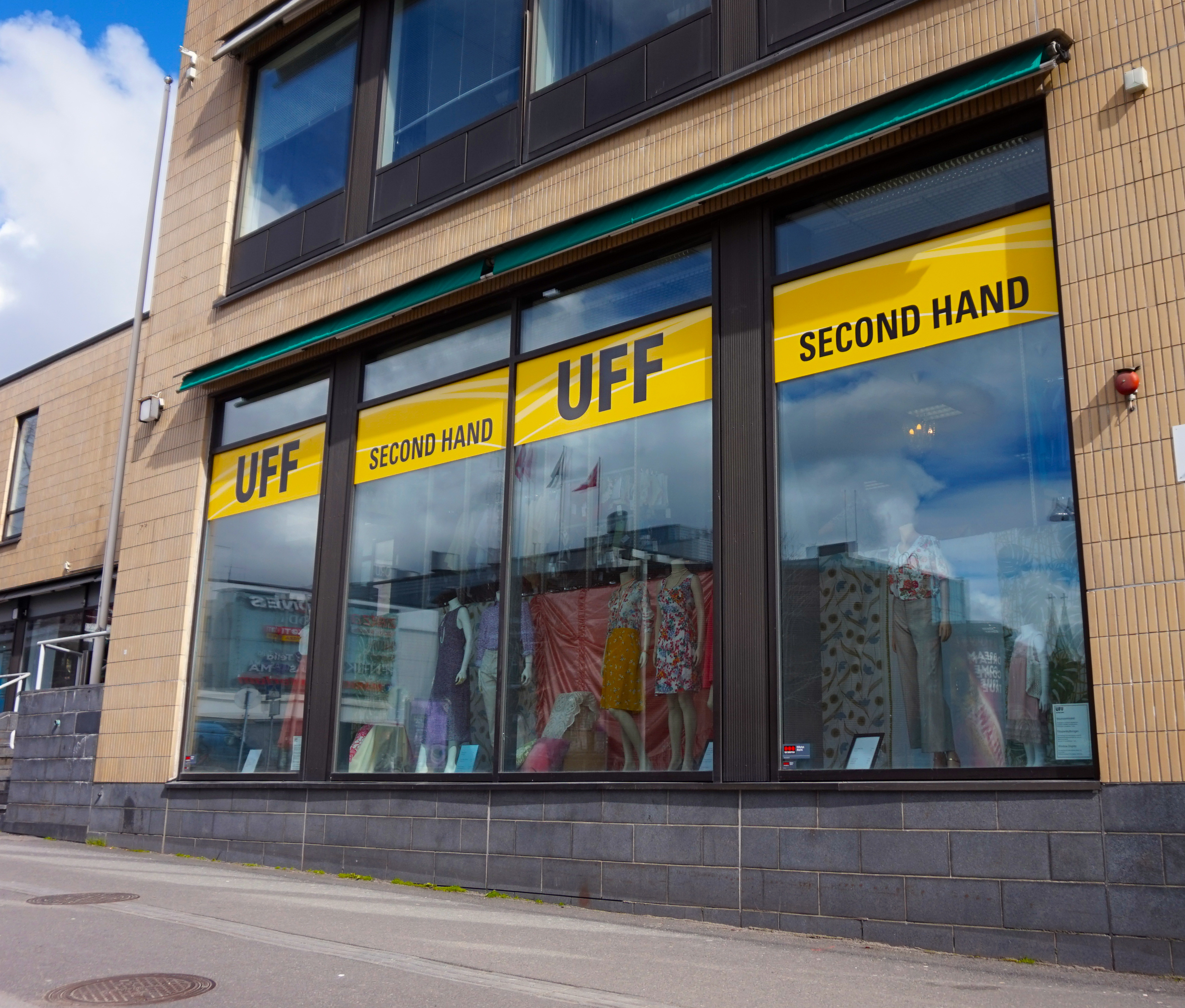
The second-hand shop of UFF (U-landshjälp från Folk till Folk i Finland), a non-profit and non-governmental humanitarian foundation, in Jyväskylä, Finland.

An aid agency, also known as development charity, is an organization dedicated to distributing aid. Many professional aid organisations exist, both within government, between governments as multilateral donors and as private voluntary organizations or non-governmental organisations. The International Committee of the Red Cross is the world's second-oldest humanitarian organisation and is unique in being mandated by international treaty to uphold the Geneva Conventions. The Sovereign Order of Malta, established in 1099 as the Order of St. John of Jerusalem, has an unbroken tradition of over 900 years of hospitaller activities, continuing to this day. Even in its modern guise under international law, it was recognized at the Congress of Verona of 1822, and since 1834 headquartered in Palazzo Malta in Rome, decades before the Red Cross.

Aid can be subdivided into two categories: humanitarian aid (emergency relief efforts, e.g. in response to natural disasters), and development aid (or foreign aid), aimed at helping countries to achieve long-term sustainable economic growth, with the aim of achieving poverty reduction. Some aid agencies carry out both kinds of aid, whilst others specialise on one aspect.

== See also ==
- Charitable organization
- Development bank
- Effective altruism
- List of development aid agencies
