= Singranatore family =

Singrahnator সিংড়ানাটোর
- Parent family: Mughal Dynasty
- Country: Bengal
- Current region: North Bengal
- Origin: British Empire
- Founded: 1887
- Founder: Mirza Zahiruddin Shah
- Members: Jalaluddin Mirza; Mirza Zafar
- Connected families: Mirzas of Hulhulia, Singra Zamindari; Sardars of Natore; Chowdhurys of Atrai; Zamindars of Kharui; Suhrawardy family
- Distinctions: Aristocracy
- Traditions: Sunni Islam
- Heirlooms: Mullah Bari Palace, Mirza Mahal, Gole Afroz College, Rahmat Iqbal College

The Singranatore family (Bengali: সিংড়ানাটোর পরিবার) is the consanguineous name given to a noble family in Rajshahi of landed aristocracy in erstwhile East Bengal (present day Bangladesh) and West Bengal that were prominent in the nineteenth century till the fall of the monarchy in India by Royal Assent in 1947 and subsequently abolished by the newly formed democratic Government of East Pakistan in 1950 by the State Acquisition Act.

The family gets the name from their former estates and land holdings in the Upazila (sub-districts or counties) of Singra and Natore. They held significant influence in local politics and administration in the area and founded the first colleges. Serving as vassals to the Maharajas of Natore and the Maharajas of Dighapatia, the clan also produced many politicians and influentials.

== History ==
During the times of the Middle kingdoms of India rent was called rajasva (the King's share). The king's men used to collect rajasva from his subjects according to law, and none could be evicted if rajasva was paid regularly. Later, the Hindu 'rajasva' became 'jama' during Muslim rule of the Mughal Empire when zamindars belonged to the nobility when the Emperor granted them mansabs (military ranks) and their ancestral domains were treated as jagirs (feudal estates).

== Origins ==
Singranatore Zamindari
- 1887–1951
- Status: Zamindars of Natore
- Capital: Singra, Natore
- Common languages: English, Urdu, Bangla
- Religion: Islam
- Zamindar Sahib
- History
  - Established: 1887
  - Disestablished: 1951

The Mughals introduced new officials and courtiers named Zaamindaars (Persian زمین Zamīn, "earth/land", and the common suffix دار -dār, "-holder") to divert the revenue back to the Imperial Capital at Delhi. Although zamindaris were allowed to be held hereditarily, the holders were not considered to be the proprietors of their estates. Unlike the autonomous or frontier chiefs, the hereditary status of the zamindar class was circumscribed by the Mughal Emperors, and the heir depended to a certain extent on the pleasure of the sovereign.

Heirs were set by descent or at times adoption by religious laws. Under the British Empire, the zamindars were to be subordinate to The Crown and not act as hereditary lords, but at times family politics was at the heart of naming an heir. At times, a cousin could be named an heir with closer family relatives present; a lawfully wedded wife could inherit the zamindari if the ruling zamindar named her as an heir.

== British rule ==
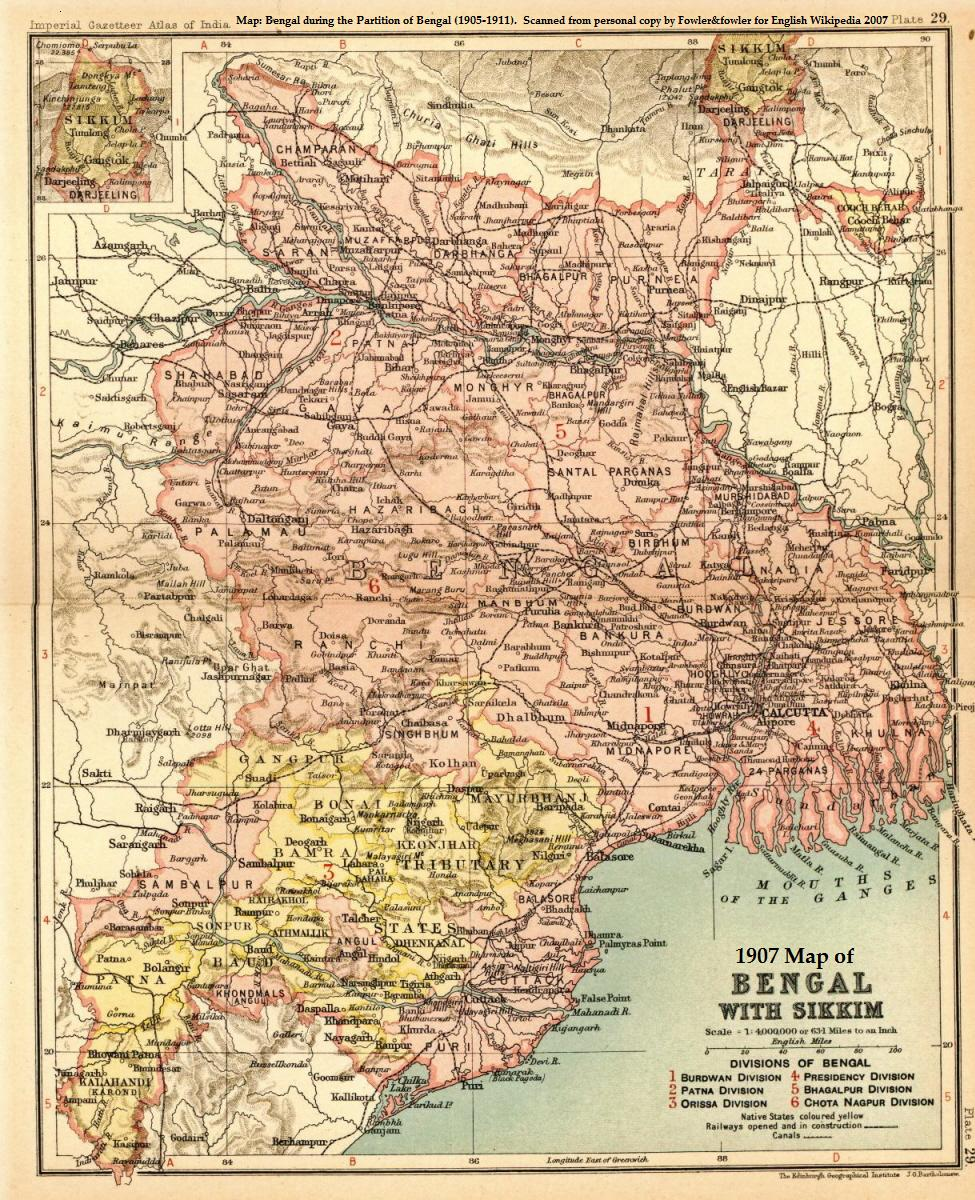
Bengal around the early 1900s

It was during the British rule, that the Zamindars of Bengal and Bihar became equivalents of the landed aristocracy. Specifically in the laws of 1793, the zamindars were created absolute owners of the estates, and not just representatives of the sovereign rulers It was also during the conquest of Bengal, that the British settlers gained power in India. In 1612, Sir Thomas Roe was instructed by King James I to visit the Mughal Emperor to arrange for a commercial treaty which would give the Company exclusive rights to reside and build factories in Surat and other areas. The British were given the ability to trade in the Indian Empire by Emperor Jahangir.

In 1757, after the Battle of Plassey, the rule of the Nawabs (governor or nobleman) were undermined by the British and later they received the diwani (Vice Royalty) from the Nawabs. In effect, the British now directly controlled Bengal and most of its zamindars who were previously under the Nawabs and the Imperial Mughal rule. The Seven Years' War (1756–1763) saw the transformation of events of 1757 to 1764 where European forces were in a struggle to oust the Indian rulers and establish rule in Bengal, that resulted in direct rule over all of India.

In 1764, the Battle of Buxar, saw the loss of Bengal from the Mughals, as Emperor Shah Alam II became a pensioner of the British after a loss. With him, Nawab Shuja-ud-Daula, the Ruler of Awadh was restored, while Nawab Mir Qasim, the Ruler of Bengal lost his control on Bengal. Murshid Quli Jafar Khan, the Nawab of Bengal governed Bengal, through his feudal chiefs, the Zamindars of Bengal who dominated all the villages in the region.

=== Zamindari influence in Bengal ===
This European conquest of The Kingdom of Bengal would later instill the Company rule in India. This would, later on, turn into the British Empire, which effectively began in 1757 after the Battle of Plassey, lasted until 1858, when, following the events of the Indian Rebellion of 1857. Under the Government of India Act 1858, the British Crown assumed direct administration of India in the new British Raj that would rule all of India (present-day India, Pakistan, Bangladesh, Nepal and Burma). While the Battle of Plassey secured a foothold for the British East India Company in the rich province of Bengal only, the Battle of Buxar is really the battle that secured its political ascendancy in India. The Viceroyalty and later direct Royal British Rule over Bengal started as the British being given the Jemmidarship (British diminutive of the word zamindari) by the Rulers of Bengal. It read:

October 31st, 1698. The Prince having given us the three towns adjacent to our Settlement, viz. De Calcutta, Chutanutte, and Gobinpore, or more properly may be said the Jemmidarship of the said towns, paying the said Rent to the King as the Jemidars have successively done, and at the same time ordering the Zamindar of the said towns to make over their Right and Title to the English upon their paying to the Jemidar(s) One thousand Rupees for the same, it was agreed that money should be paid, being the best Money that ever was spent for so great a Privilege; but the Jemmidar(s) making a great Noise, being unwilling to part with their country and finding them to continue in their averseness, notwithstanding the Prince had an officer upon them to bring them to a Compliance, it is agreed that 1,500 Rupees be paid them, provided they will relinquish their title to the said towns, and give it under their Hands in Writing, that they have made over the same to the Right Honourable Company. Ext of Consns. at Chuttanutte, the 29th December (Printed for Parliament in 1788).

They were one of the few Muslim zamindars in Bengal, at a time when the territories were mainly ruled by the Hindu raj families (Royal families) such as the Maharajas of Dighapatia Raj (who were very close to the Singranatore family as well, the Mullahbari palatial complex houses various artefacts from the Hindu rajas). Structures have been deemed of historic significance by the government. The first ever trip of an elected Head of State in the history of the region was when former military ruler and President Lt General Hussain Muhammad Ershad in 1986 when he was invited by MM Rahmatullah.

During the Mughal era (specifically during the rule of Emperor Aurangzeb), the Mansabdari system, the military nobility evolved into the aristocratic landed zamindari system. The former, which was a military-type grading of all imperial officials of the Mughal Empire were courtiers who governed the empire and commanded its armies in the emperor's name. Mansabs were of three classes, 7,000 to 3,000 were called Amir-i-Azam or "the greater nobles"; 2,500 to 500 were called Amirs or nobles and 400 to 20 were called Mansabdars or officers. It is from the world Amir that the family title came to be. The word Mīrzā is derived from the Persian term ‘Amīrzāde which literally means "child of the 'Amīr" or "child of the ruler" in Persia‘Amīrzād in turn consists of the Arabic title ‘Amīr (engl. Emir), meaning "commander", and the Persian suffix -zād, meaning "birth" or "lineage". Due to vowel harmony in Turkic languages, the alternative pronunciation Morza (plural morzalar; derived from the Persian word) is also used.

Though the mansabdars were usually aristocrats, they did not form a feudal aristocracy, for neither the offices nor the estates that supported them were hereditary. However, senior mansabdars were awarded a jagir (personal fief) rather than a salary. Rates of remuneration, which included both the mansabdar's salary and so much per Sowar (सवार,ਸਵਾਰ; meaning a cavalry troop), were matched by jagirs affording a similar aggregate yield. If their specified yield came to more, the surplus was due to the imperial treasury; if the jagirdar (or zamindar) extracted more than the specified yield, he kept it.

Descended from former mansabdars as hereditary Mirzas, they are a cadet branch of the Imperial family of India, descended from a perso-Turkic dynasty. They moved after the imperial family was abolished in 1858 following the first Indian war of independence, to Bengal (where around 70 more descendants moved) possibly because Calcutta in Bengal was made the new capital (1858–1912) of the Empire.

=== Natore Raj and zamindari in Natore ===
In 1706 Raja Ramjivan Ray established his capital called "Nator" by filling the Chalan Beel. Nator meant 'stop the boat' as Nao meant boat and tharo meant stop. Natore was the headquarters of the British district of Rajshahi from 1769 to 1825 during colonial rule. From, Between 1786 and 1790, the new Governor-General Lord Cornwallis and Sir John Shore (later Governor-General) entered a heated debate over whether or not to introduce a permanent settlement with the zamindars. Shore argued that the native zamindars would not trust the permanent settlement to be permanent, and that it would take time before they realised it was genuine. Cornwallis believed that they would immediately accept it and begin investing in improving their land. In 1790 the Court of Directors issued a ten-year (Decennial) settlement to the zamindars, which was made permanent in 1800. By the Permanent Settlement Act of 1793 (Bengali: চিরস্থায়ী বন্দোবস্ত), the Zamindars class became more powerful than they were in the Mughal period. This agreement between the East India Company and Bengali lords to fix revenues to be raised from land, with far-reaching consequences for both agricultural methods and productivity in the entire Empire and the political realities of the Indian countryside. It was concluded in 1793, by the Company administration headed by Charles, Earl Cornwallis. It formed one part of a larger body of legislation enacted known as the Cornwallis Code. In 1825 the headquarters were moved to Rajshahi and in 1829 Natore became a subdivision of Rajshahi district. In 1845 Natore Mahukuma was established. Natore town became a Municipality in 1869. The Bengal Tenancy Act of 1885 was enacted. With the increase of population and rise of prices of agricultural produce in the nineteenth century, demand for land increased. As a result, zamindars used to increase rents and land revenues. The Ryots (tenants) refused to accept the zamindari right to enhance rent beyond the customary rates. Zamindars, as absolute lords of the lands were not prepared to recognise such customary rights.

=== 1885 Bengal tenancy laws ===
Another factor that lead to the class discontent was the emergence of a landed intermediate class of lesser nobles (Chowdhurys and Taluqdars), whose existence contrary to the rules of the Permanent Settlement. The madhyasvatvas or intermediate interests acquired their rights by purchase, and not inheritance. According to the law, these madhyasvatvas did not exist. The law courts were giving conflicting judgements as regards the rights and liabilities of the intermediate classes and also of the peasants. The government tried to accommodate this class by enacting the Rent Act in 1859. To improve relations between landlord and tenant, a Rent Commission was set up in 1880. By the recommendations and observations of the Rent Commission, the Bengal Legislative Council enacted Act III of 1885 which defined rights and obligations of intermediate tenancies and raiyati tenancies. In 1905, Bengal was partitioned and then the Government of India Act 1919 and Government of India Act 1935 were enacted. Finally in 1947, Bengal was further partitioned once again before the Indian Independence Act 1947 was enacted that separated the old Indian Empire into the Dominion of Pakistan and the Dominion of India in the month of August of the same year.

== Abolition ==
The East Bengal State Acquisition and Tenancy Act of 1950 was passed by the newly formed Democratic Government of the Dominion of Pakistan for its eastern provinces (East Bengal, present day Bangladesh). The bill was drafted on 31 March 1948 during the after the fall of the British Monarchy in India, and passed on 16 May 1951. Most of the princely states in the western part of empire (Pakistan) merged into the province of West Pakistan on 14 October 1955 and the new nation was declared a republic within a year although some of the frontier states continued to be administered as separate units. During the same period 1948–1950, some of the remaining princely states joined India, and the Indian zamindaris were also abolished.

In return for surrendering the government of their states in the case of Princes, and estates in the case of Zamindars, together with their revenues and military forces, the former ruling princes were guaranteed their hereditary styles and titles, certain privileges of rank and honour, as well as privy purses to cover the living expenses of themselves and their families. However, this too was abolished in 1956. In 1971, the styles and titles enjoyed by the former ruling families ceased to be officially recognised by the Government of Pakistan in January 1972. The previous year East province of Pakistan (East Pakistan) became independent as the sovereign state of the People's Republic of Bangladesh. Pakistan was renamed the Islamic Republic of Pakistan where most of the formerly ruling families continued to exercise significant influence and considerable political and economic power. After a year-long battle in Republic of India, an amendment to the Constitution at the end of 1971 abolished the privy purses, guaranteed by the Indian Constitution and eliminated the princely order and the zamindari system itself.

In 1984, Natore subdivision was turned into a district in independent Bangladesh.

British media sometimes accorded their zamindar status as 'Princes'. After the War of 1971, they held considerable alliances with ruling presidents, military dictators and prime ministers, all the while refraining from elected public offices. The family still owns most of the lands as private estates, and taxes the inhabitants on produce from the lands, which in turn pays for the upkeep of the land holdings, buildings, etc. Most of the residences used by the family lies mostly uninhabited, yet under the ownership of the family.

== Philanthropy ==
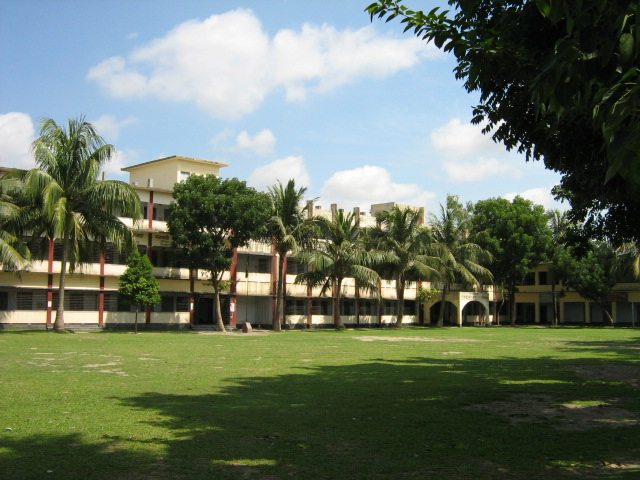
Goleafroz College

The family set the Gole Afroz College in the provincial government of East Pakistan and it became and still stands as the only public college of Singra. It is one of the five government colleges in the Natore District, and the third oldest, established before the War of 1971 and the Independence of Bangladesh. Although it was a private college of the aristocratic Singranatore family, in 1986, the then President and former military ruler, HM Ershad announced that it would be made into a public college. Since then it is under the Ministry of Education of the Government of Bangladesh. It is named after Begum Gole Afroz, a member of the Singranatore family of Rajshahi, the daughter of Begum GulBadan and Shamezuddin Ahmed. She was a granddaughter of Mirza Jalaluddin, the last zamindar of Natore and the wife of MM Rahmatullah.

=== Buildings and estates ===
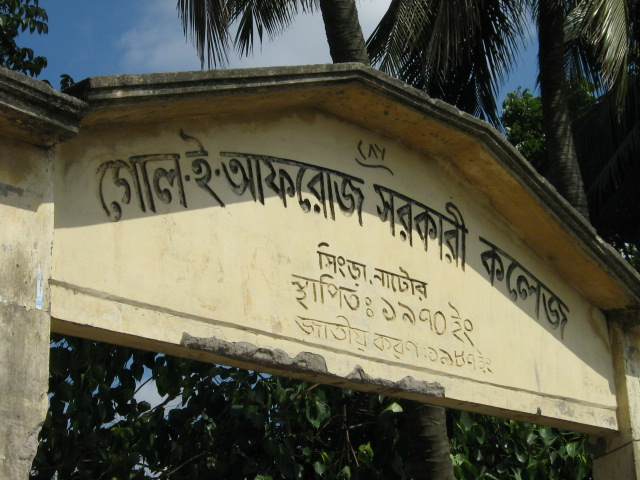
One of the old gates of the Gole Afroz College

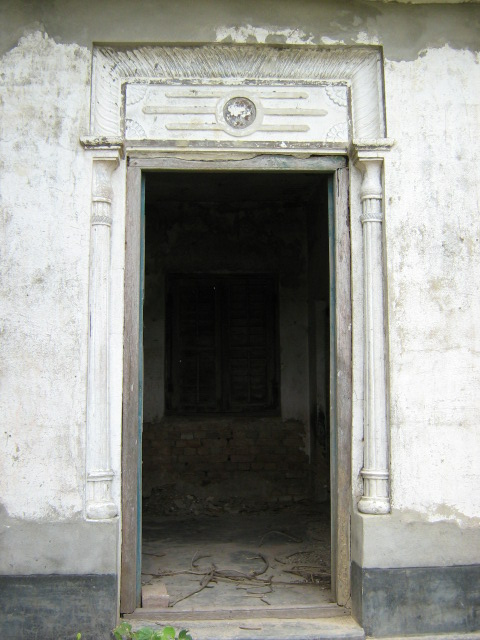
Doorway to Durbal hall (boithok khana) or meeting chamber.

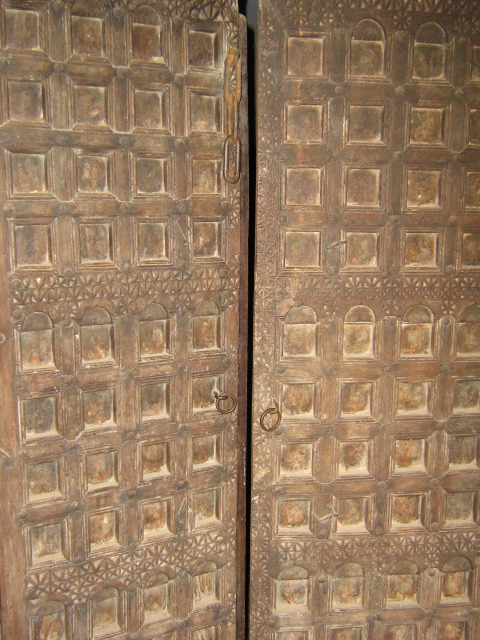
Doorway

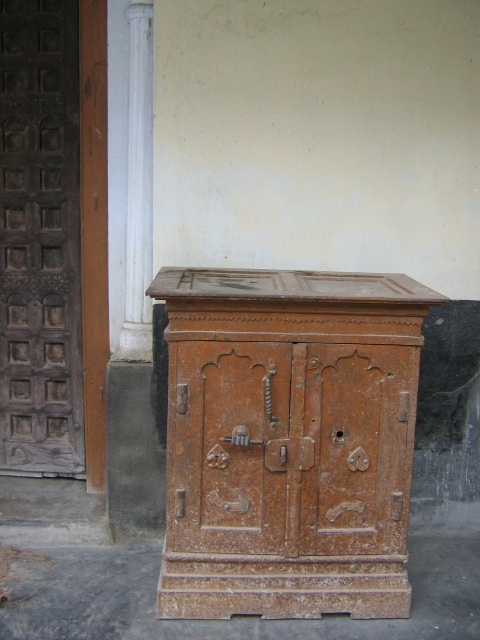
Chest at the entrance of the Malabare Mansion

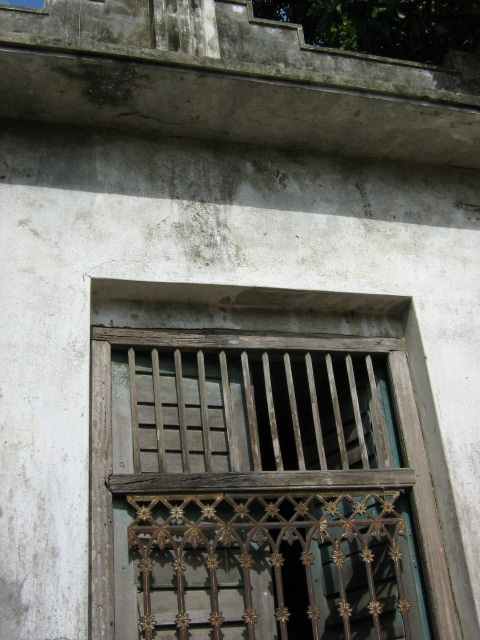
Old window of the Malabare Mansion

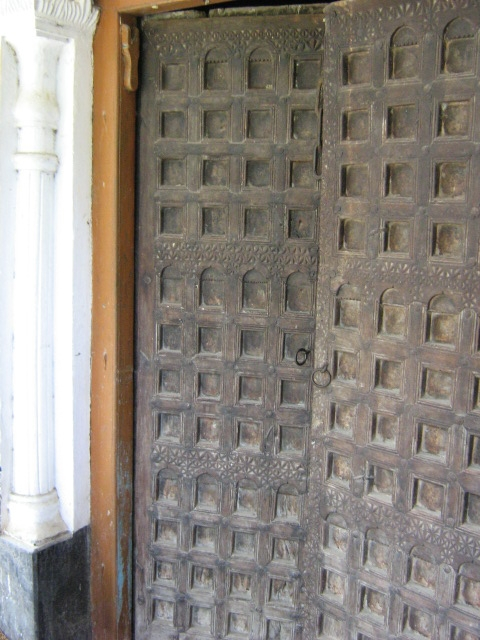

== Notables members ==
- Jalaluddin Mirza
- Mirza Zafar
- Colonel (Retd) Sarwar Azam

== See also ==
- Feudalism
  - Feudalism in England
- Landed property
- Maharaja
- Manorialism
- Medieval demography
- Middle Ages
- Princely States
- Protofeudalism
- Puthia Raj family
- Quia Emptores
- Raja
- Ryotwari
- Serfdom
- Statutes of Mortmain

== Bibliography ==
- Burnell, A. C.; Yule, Henry (1903) [First published 1890s]. Crooke, William (ed.). Hobson-Jobson: A Glossary of Colloquial Anglo-Indian Words and Phrases, and of Kindred Terms, Etymological, Historical, Geographical and Discursive (New ed.). London: John Murray.
- Hansen, Valerie; Curtis, Kenneth (2008). Voyages in World History, Volume 2. Stamford, Connecticut: Wadsworth Publishing. ISBN 978-0-618-07725-0.
- Higgingbotham, J. (1872). Madras High Court reports: reports of cases decided in the High Court of Madras. Madras, India: High Court of India.
- Markovits, Claude (2002). A History of Modern India, 1480–1950. Bangladesh: Anthem Press. ISBN 978-1-84331-004-4.
- McLane, John R. (2002). Land and Local Kingship in Eighteenth-Century Bengal. Cambridge University Press. ISBN 978-0-521-05120-0.
- Metcalf, Barbara Daly (1984). Moral Conduct and Authority: The Place of Adab in South Asian Islam. University of California Press. ISBN 978-0-520-04660-3.
- Monnier, Emile Henry (1902). A digest of Indian law cases: containing High court reports, 1862–1900, and Privy council reports of appeals from India, 1836–1900, with an index of cases, Volume 3. Calcutta, India: Great Britain, Privy Council-Judicial Committee.
- Presidency, Indian (1888). The Indian law reports : Madras series. University of California.
- Ramchandani, Indu (2000). Students' Britannica India, Volumes 1–5. United Kingdom: Encyclopædia Britannica. ISBN 978-0-85229-760-5.
- Report, House Committee (1804). Reports from Committees of the House of Commons: repr. by order of ..., Volume 4. House of Commons of the United Kingdom.
