= Jalaluddin Mirza =

Moghul Prince and Zamindar of Natore

Mirza Jalaluddin
- Zamindar of Natore
- Born: 4 August 1898; Natore, Bengal, British India
- Died: 2 May 1975 (aged 76); Dacca, Bangladesh
- Burial: Natore, Bangladesh
- Spouse: Jamila Begum Sahiba
- Issue: Gulbadan Begum of Natore (heir); 4 sons and a daughter.
Names
- Mirza Muhammad Jalaluddin Mridha Sahib of Singra and Natore
- House: House of Singra-Natore
- Father: Muhammad Mirza Jafaar, Zamindar of Natore

Sahibzada Mīrzā Mu'hammad Jalāl ud-Dīn Mridha Sahib, better known as Jalaluddin Mirza (1898–1975), was a Bengali Indian aristocrat in the erstwhile British Empire who served as the fifth and last hereditary Zamindar of Natore from the House of Singra and Natore before it was abolished in 1951.

== Early life ==
He was born in 1898 as the son of Sahibzada Muhammad Mirza Jafaar (1876-1921) and his principle first wife, in Mirza Mahal palace in Natore and educated at the Rajshahi Collegiate School alongside the Dighapatia princes. He was named by his grandfather Sahibzada Zahir Shah Mirza (1855-1899) after his illustrious ancestor Mirza Jalaluddin Muhammad (1542-1605), 3rd Mughal Emperor . Mirza married Jamila Begum.

== Background ==
His father served as the "Mridha" or the Military Governor to the Maharaja of Rajshahi, while he paid tributary to the Maharaja of Dighapatia as a Madhyasvatva (subinfeudated or vassal) as after his father death he took over the dignitaries as the zamindar. One of the few Muslim zamindari in Natore, during the Partition of India in 1947 the newly formed Islamic Government of Pakistan favored Muslim families and especially when Bengal was split the old Hindu Rajas (Kings) of East Bengal left resulting in most of the neighboring estates coming under him and his full brothers. From his father's death in 1921 till his election as the Zamindar in 1932, his brothers managed the Singranatore estate.

=== Death and legacy ===
He died in 1975 and his oldest child Gulbadan Begum of Natore (1923-2005) succeeded him as the head of the Singranatore family. In 1950 during the abolition, the Singra Natore Zamindari was at its fullest extent, annexing villages formerly governed by High caste Hindu families. Most of his children were married off to notable land holding and feudal noble families of aristocratic lines.

An educationalist and philanthropist, he was a patron and educator of the Rajshahi Collegiate School, the oldest school of the Indian subcontinent. He donated lands towards the building of many schools. The first College of Singra, Gole Afroz College was named after his oldest granddaughter and was established in East Pakistan. After the war of 1971, the college was personally nationalized by Hussain Muhammad Ershad, the President of Bangladesh in 1986.

== See also ==
- Zamindars of Bengal

Jalaluddin Mirza House of Singra and Natore
Titles in pretence
Preceded by Mirza Zafar	— TITULAR — Zamindar of Natore; Zamindar Sahib of Singra; Jalaluddin Mirza; 1932–1975	Succeeded by Gulbadan Begum of Natore

== Sources ==
- Chowdhury, S. R. Kumar; P. K., Singh; Ismail, M. Ali (2012). Blood Dynasties: Zemindaris of Bengal - A Chronicle of Bengal's Ruling families (Paperback). Dictus: Politics and Democracy series. ISBN 9783847385080.
