= Gulbadan Begum of Natore =

Gulbadan Begum গুলবদন বেগম
- Spouse: Mullah Shamez Uddin Ahmed
Names
- Sahibzadi Gulbadan Begum
- Dynasty: Timurid dynasty
- Father: Jalaluddin Mirza

Gulbadan Begum (Bengali: গুলবদন বেগম; 1923, Hulhulia, Natore – May 8, 2005, Dhaka) was a Bengali social worker, and former head of the princely Singranatore family, the eldest daughter of Jalaluddin Mirza, the Zamindar of Natore.

== Biography ==
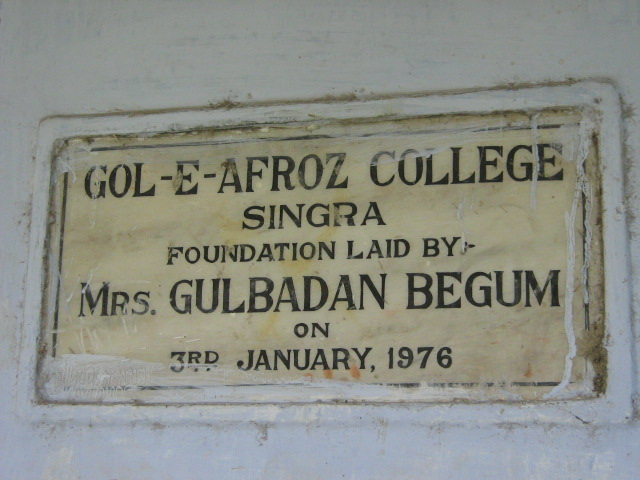
A marble plaque commemorating Gulbadan Begum's contribution to the first college in Singra.

Born in 1923 in the Bengal Presidency of the British Empire, she was named after her distant ancestor Princess Gulbadan Begum, the youngest daughter of Emperor Babur, by her grandfather, zamindar (lord) Mirza Zafar of Natore. Her younger sister, who married a Sardar (regional chief) of Natore was named Gulchehra Begum after Princess Gulchehra Begum, another daughter of Emperor Babur.

She was educated privately and in her teenage years she was married to Mullah Shamez Uddin Ahmed, the erstwhile Qadi of Natore and descendant of Mullah Shah Badakhshi. Her husband died in 1968 before the war of 1971. She had six children that survived to adulthood.

She died on May 8, 2005, at Army Cantonment and is buried at the Singranatore estate. At the end of 2005, following relinquishing command of the Bangladesh Army and upon military retirement, her third son (second surviving) Sahibzada Colonel Muhammad Shahid Sarwar Azam Shah Jahan assumed headship of the Singranatore family.

=== Family ===
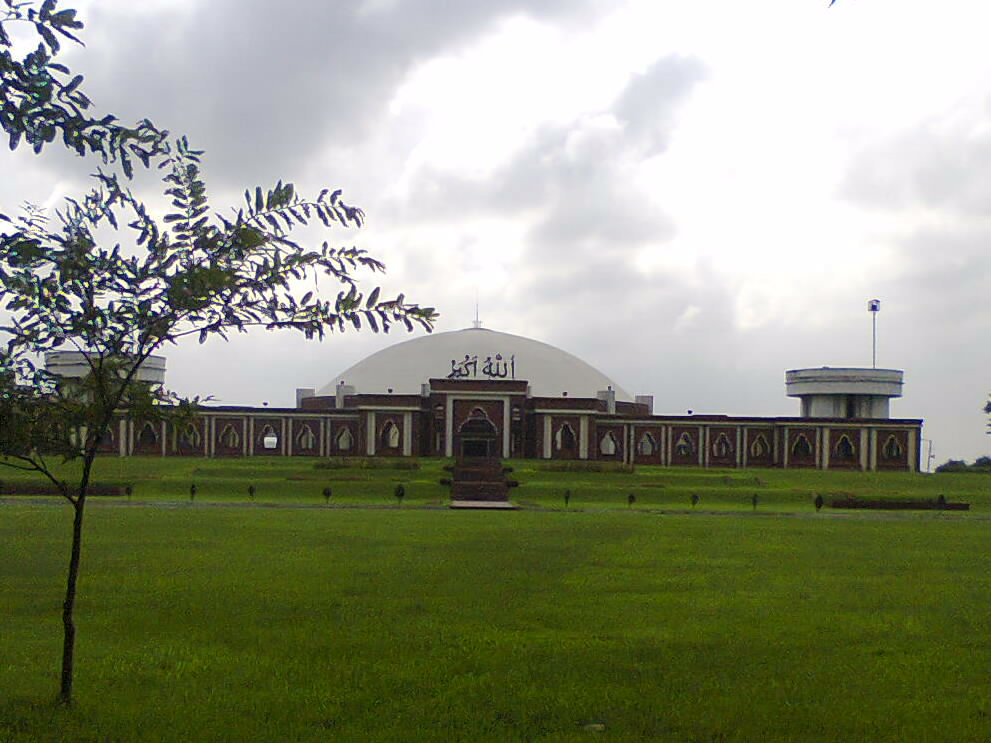
The Senakendrio mosque in Dhaka was the site of the Salat al-Janazah of Gulbadan Begum after her death in 2005

- Al-haj Sahibzada Abul Bashar Muhammad Akhtar Hussain the former General Manager of Bangladesh National Oils.
- Begum Gole Afroz, Bengali socialite and wife of MM Rahmatullah.
- Sahibzada Professor Abu Naser Muhammad Asad-uz-zaman, political scientist in Bogra, died 1997.
- Colonel Sahibzada Muhammad Shahid Sarwar, military commander of Rajshahi, the family's home state and took part in United Nations Mission in Sierra Leone in West Africa, 2003
- Lieutenant Colonel Sahibzada Dr. Muhammad Shahid Sarwar Alam, military officer who took part in the United Nations Mission in Sudan in Africa, 2005
- Gulroze Nahar Chowdhury, a lawyer.

== Sources ==
- S. S. Roy (2011) A chronicle of Bengal's Ruling families. Calcutta
