= Mirza Zafar =

Moghul Prince and Zamindar of Natore

Mirza Zafar میرزا ظفر
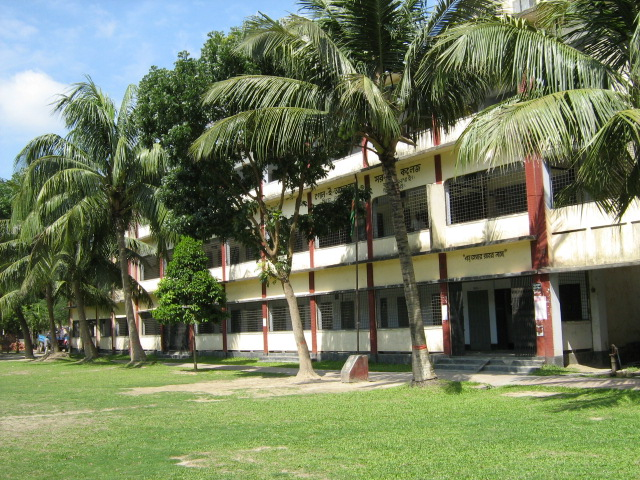
- Singra's first college, the Gole Afroz College was built on the sprawling estate of Mirza Zafar and named after his great-granddaughter, Gole Afroz.
- Spouse: Multiple
- Issue: Jalaluddin Mirza
Names
- Sahibzada Muhammad Zafaruddin Mirza
- Dynasty: Singranatore family
- Father: Sahib Zahir Shah Mirza
- Religion: Islam

Sahib Muhammad Ja'faar ud-Din Mirza Mridha (born 1876 in Bengal, died 1921 in Natore) was a feudal lord in Bengal, British India who served as the second Zamindar of Natore from the House of Singra and Natore and the "Mridha" (Defense Minister) under the Maharajas of Rajshahi.

== Family ==
He was born in 1876 as the first son of Muhammad Zaheer Shah Mirza Sahib, the patriarch of the aristocratic Singranatore family in Mirza Mahal palace in Natore and educated privately in Persian, Arabic, Hindi, Urdu, and Bengali before attending the Rajshahi Collegiate School. He married twice, firstly Humaira Begum and the Abeeda Sultana and had three sons and a daughter.

== Biography and military affairs (1870-1921) ==
His father crushed the Pabna Peasant Uprisings in 1871 for which he was given tracts of land with the ownership made hereditary as a Madhyasvatva. After the death of his father, he ascended to his position and rights as a zamindar. His father had served under Maharaja Chondronath Roy of Natore and maintained 25 horses for 30 lathial (foot soldiers) and three elephants.

=== Death ===
He died in 1921 of cholera in Natore Sadar, British India.

=== Later successors and legacy ===
The estate which he inherited was extended outwards and was made up of fragmented lands belonging to the declining Ruling family of Natore, which was at one point the second largest estate in all of Bengal after the Maharajas of Burdwan. His son, Jalaluddin Mirza inherited the position after his death in Bengal.

== See also ==
- Zamindar of Natore

== Bibliography ==
- Chowdhury, S. R. Kumar; P. K., Singh; Ismail, M. Ali (2012). Blood Dynasties: Zemindaris of Bengal - A Chronicle of Bengal's Ruling families (Paperback). Politics and Democracy series. Dictus Publishing. ISBN 9783847385080.
