= Basanta Kumar Roy =

Member of the Dighapatia Raj family

- বসন্ত কুমার রায়
- Born: 19th century Dighapatia, Bengal Presidency, British India
- Died: 20th century
- Occupation: Zamindar
- Known for: Appellant in *Basant Kumar Roy v. Secretary of State for India* (1917)
- Family: Dighapatia Raj

Raja Basanta Kumar Roy was a Bengali zamindar and a scion of the Dighapatia Raj family based in Natore, Bengal.

He is notable in legal history as the primary appellant in the landmark Privy Council property case Basant Kumar Roy v. Secretary of State for India (1917). The litigation established important legal precedents regarding limitation periods, continuous possession, and the ownership of alluvial lands (churs) reformed in situ following the shifting of the Ganges river system.
