= M. M. Rahmatullah =

Indian politician (1940-2014)

Muhammad Rahmatullah
- মোহাম্মদ রহমত উললাহ

Chief Engineer Public Works Department
- In office 1986–1988
- President: Hussain Muhammad Ershad
- Prime Minister: Khaleda Zia

Chairman Capital Development Authority
- In office 1989–1992
- President: Hussain Muhammad Ershad

Personal details
- Born: 13 June 1940 (age 86) Rajshahi, British India
- Education: Bangladesh University of Engineering and Technology
- Occupation: Engineer

Mian Muhammad Rahmatullah, (Bengali: মোহাম্মদ রহমত উললাহ, 13 June 1940 – 2014) was a former East Pakistani and later Bangladeshi bureaucrat and politician. He was the former chief engineer of the Public Works Department and later the chairman of the Capital Development Authority of the Government of Bangladesh. In 2000, he was an electoral candidate from Natore Area for the Parliament of Bangladesh.

In 1991, after former military dictator General Ershad stepped down as the president of Bangladesh, Rahmatullah was charged in the infamous Janata Tower Case and named the third defendant after the president and the former first lady (and Member of Parliament) by the Supreme Court of Bangladesh. He was later acquitted when the judge agreed that the case was filed on political grounds by the newly elected ruling party.

He was the husband of Gole Afroz of the aristocratic Singranatore family; the granddaughter of Jalaluddin Mirza, a Zamindar of Natore and was instrumental in building the Gole Afroz College, which was named after his wife.

== Early life and education ==
Rahmatullah was born to an eminent landholding Muslim family called the Mandals and the clan gave name to the town of origin, Mondolpara (meaning "area of the Mandals" in Bengali) in Natore, then part of British India. The Mondol family were chiefs of the Mandals or small estates of the Raj.

After being educated around Rajshahi, he graduated from the Ahsanullah College of Engineering in Dacca with a BS in civil engineering and became a public official during the East Pakistan Provincial Government, where he served as a divisional engineer before becoming the superintending engineer. He served throughout the 1971 War of Liberation and then joined the government service of independent Bangladesh.

== Career ==
He witnessed the partitioning of India and Pakistan in 1947, where the responsibility of engineering and construction work for the Central Government of Pakistan was vested in the Central Public Works Department. The Communication and Building Directorate (C&B), which existed at the time, was entrusted with all construction work for the Provincial Government of the then East Pakistan. After the liberation of Bangladesh in 1971, the country inherited two separate organizations for the construction and maintenance of Government Buildings: the Central PWD and the Buildings Directorate of the Provincial Government. These two entities were merged into one department in 1977 to form the Public Works Department (PWD) of which he became the appointed (executivr chief engineer) before becoming the agency chief (chairman) of Rajdhani Unnayan Kartripakkha (RAJUK), which was then known as Dhaka Improvement Trust since 1956 and sat at the RAJUK Bhaban in the capital city of Dhaka.

=== Charges ===
On 14 April 1991, the Bureau of Anti-Corruption sued the president of Bangladesh, his wife Rowshan Ershad and the chief of RAJUK, M.M. Rahmatullah. In September 1989, it was alleged that he and the former president Hussain Muhammad Ershad in collusion with each other dishonestly and fraudulently with malafide intention helped to illegally get public land in their favour and then helped private executives to get 12 kathas of land at a negligible sum causing loss to RAJUK amounting to BDT 54,870,900 to obtain advantage for themselves. All other accused acted illegally in collusion with each other thereby abusing their position as public servants (as President of Bangladesh and appointed chief of a public agency) which is punishable under section 109 of the Bangladesh Penal Code and section 5(2) of the Prevention of Corruption Act, 1947.

The officials were sentenced to simple imprisonment for seven years, at which point an appeal was made. The High Court Division heard the appeal, along with others and dismissed the appeal with modification of the sentence from simple imprisonment of seven years to a sentence of fine of Taka 10,000 each, in default, to suffer for two years in prison each and maintained the order of confiscation of the landed property.

=== Cases ===
In the case of State Vs. M.M Rahmatullah, the High Court Division of the Supreme Court of Bangladesh expressed its opinion on Article 7 (2) of the Bangladesh Passport Order, 1973 that apprehension on the part of the authority seizing the passport that the holder of the passport will not return to Bangladesh, if he is allowed to leave the country was not a ground for impounding of a passport of a citizen who wants to leave the country for medical check up and treatment. This argument can be applied to many identical situations. Right to travel abroad is a fundamental right as recognized in Article 36 of the Bangladeshi Constitution.

It was noted that the Supreme Court of India has taken a similar view in the case of Satwant Singh Vs. D. Ramarathnam, Assistant Passport Officer, New Delhi and others, AIR 1967 (SC) 1836 wherein it has been observed that withdrawal of a passport given to an individual violates Articles 21 and 14 of Indian Constitution.

=== Implications ===
The Supreme Court has upheld the High Court ruling of jail and fines in the 'much-publicised' Janata Tower graft case against former first lady Raushan Ershad and Rahmatullah. Raushan's husband, the former president, however, had been convicted of the charges and sentenced of five years in prison.

After three and a half years in prison, the Appellate Division maintained the fine but relieved Ershad from serving out the remaining one and a half years. As a result, the chief of Bangladesh Jatiya Party could not participate in the 2001 Elections. He along with the former First Lady were later acquitted when the Judge agreed that the case was filed on political grounds by the newly elected ruling party and he went on to contest elections representing Singra constituency in 2001 even though the former president could not. He was defeated by the alliances of BAL and BNP parties. He retired and permanently quit politics in 2002.

== Family, later life and political career ==
He unsuccessfully contested the seat of Natore-3 constituency as a Member of Parliament to Jatiyo Sangshad (The National Assembly) of the People's Republic of Bangladesh in the Eighth National Parliamentary Elections of 2001.

He married Begum Gole Afroz and had four daughters and three sons.

== See also ==
- Loh Wai Kong v. Government of Malaysia
