= Uttara Ganabhaban =

Uttara Gana Bhaban
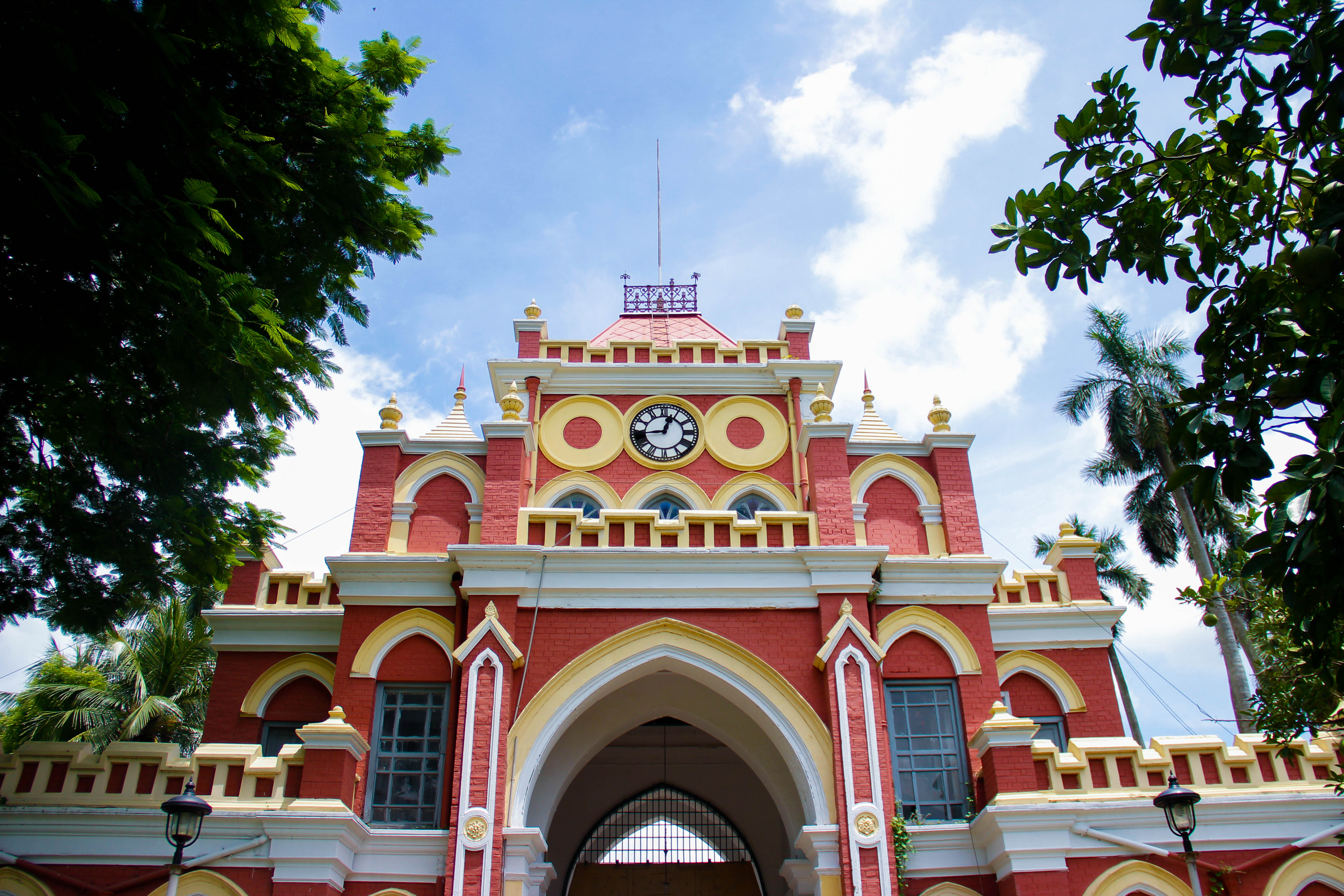
- Clocktower gate at the Uttara Gana Bhaban

- Location within Bangladesh

General information
- Architectural style: Indo-Saracenic architecture
- Location: Natore, Bangladesh
- Coordinates: 24°26′25″N 89°00′37″E
- Completed: 18th century

The Uttara Ganabhaban (Bengali: উত্তরা গণভবন, romanized: Uttora Gonobhobon, lit. 'Northern People's House') is an 18th-century (1734) royal palace also known as Dighapatia Palace (Bengali: দিঘাপতিয়া রাজবাড়ী, romanized: Dighapotiya Rajbari) as it was formerly the seat of the Dighapatia Raj, an aristocratic landed estate in the East Bengal of India. It is a fine example of a jomidar bari (country house). It was built by Raja Doyaram who was the Dewan (minister) of Rani Bhavanee.

It has a round clock on its front gate with a large bell and a clock room. The clock was imported from Italy. It also has a beautiful garden full of various foreign trees and Italian marble stone statues of women. It is located near Natore town in North Bengal. It serves as the principal residence of the Bangladeshi prime minister in the northern part of the country. It has been used as a ceremonial site for receiving foreign ambassadors.

== History ==
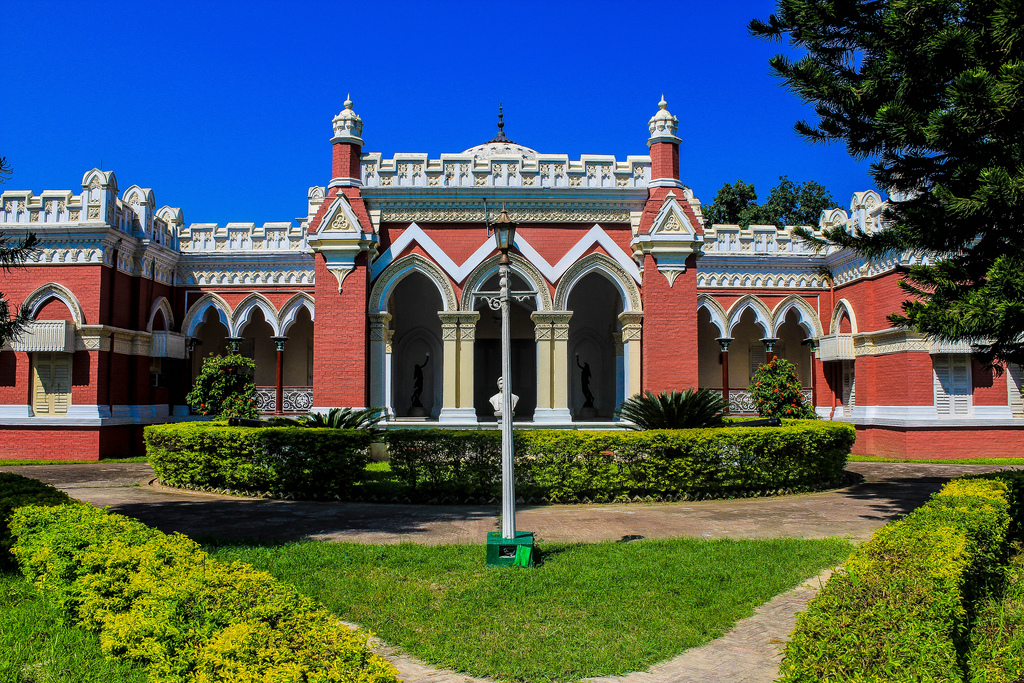
An entrance to the palace

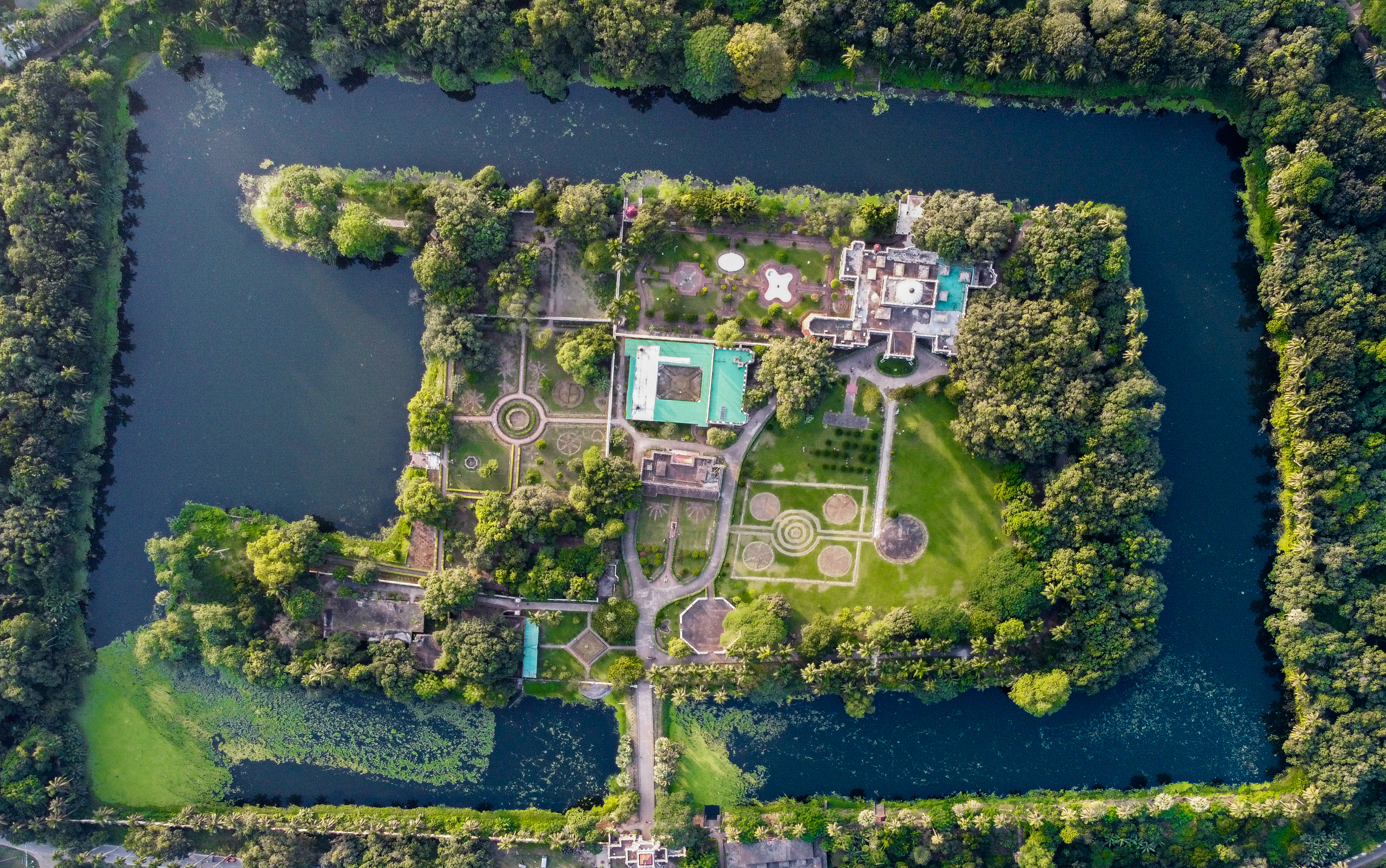
Birdseye view of the Palace

There has been a house on the site since the early 18th century, when the Nawab of Bengal rewarded Dayaram Roy for suppressing a rebellion. Roy was awarded the title of Jagirdar and given the zamindari of vast tracts of land in Jessore, Rajshahi, Bogra and Mymensingh. When the British Empire enforced the permanent settlement in Bengal, the Roys were recognised as landed Maharajas. They were avid followers of European influence, fashion, art, and culture. Their palace was developed on the outskirts of Natore in the 19th century. The town of Natore served as the headquarters of Rajshahi Division in the Bengal Presidency, and thus was an important administrative centre. Following Partition in 1947, the estate was formally abolished during major land reforms in East Bengal.

On 24 July 1967, it was designated as a gubernatorial residence by Abdul Monem Khan, the governor of East Pakistan. The palace was used by President Ayub Khan as a retreat when Bangladesh was a part of Pakistan as its eastern wing. After the independence of Bangladesh, Prime Minister Sheikh Mujibur Rahman, the founding father of the Bangladeshi republic, declared the palace as his official residence in northern Bangladesh on 9 February 1972. It has since been used by successive Bangladeshi heads of government for holding cabinet, political and diplomatic meetings outside the capital.

=== Uttara Ganabhaban Museum ===
Uttara Ganabhaban Museum is located in Uttara Ganabhaban of Natore district. The museum was established on March 9, 2018. At least one hundred items of historical interest have been found in the archives at Uttara Ganobhaban. Cabinet Secretary Mohammad Shafiul Alam inaugurated the museum.

== Gallery ==
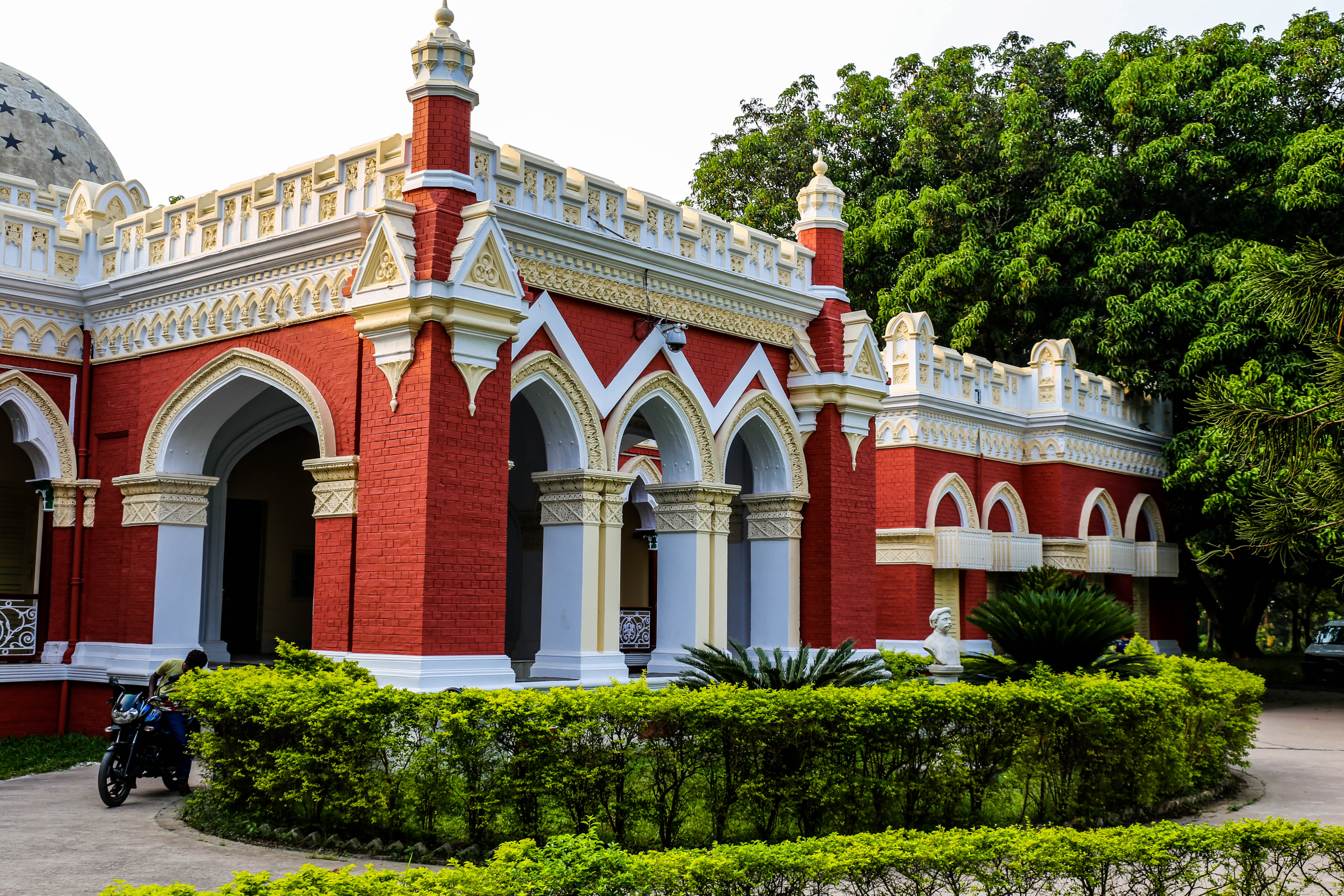
Side view of Uttara Ganabhaban

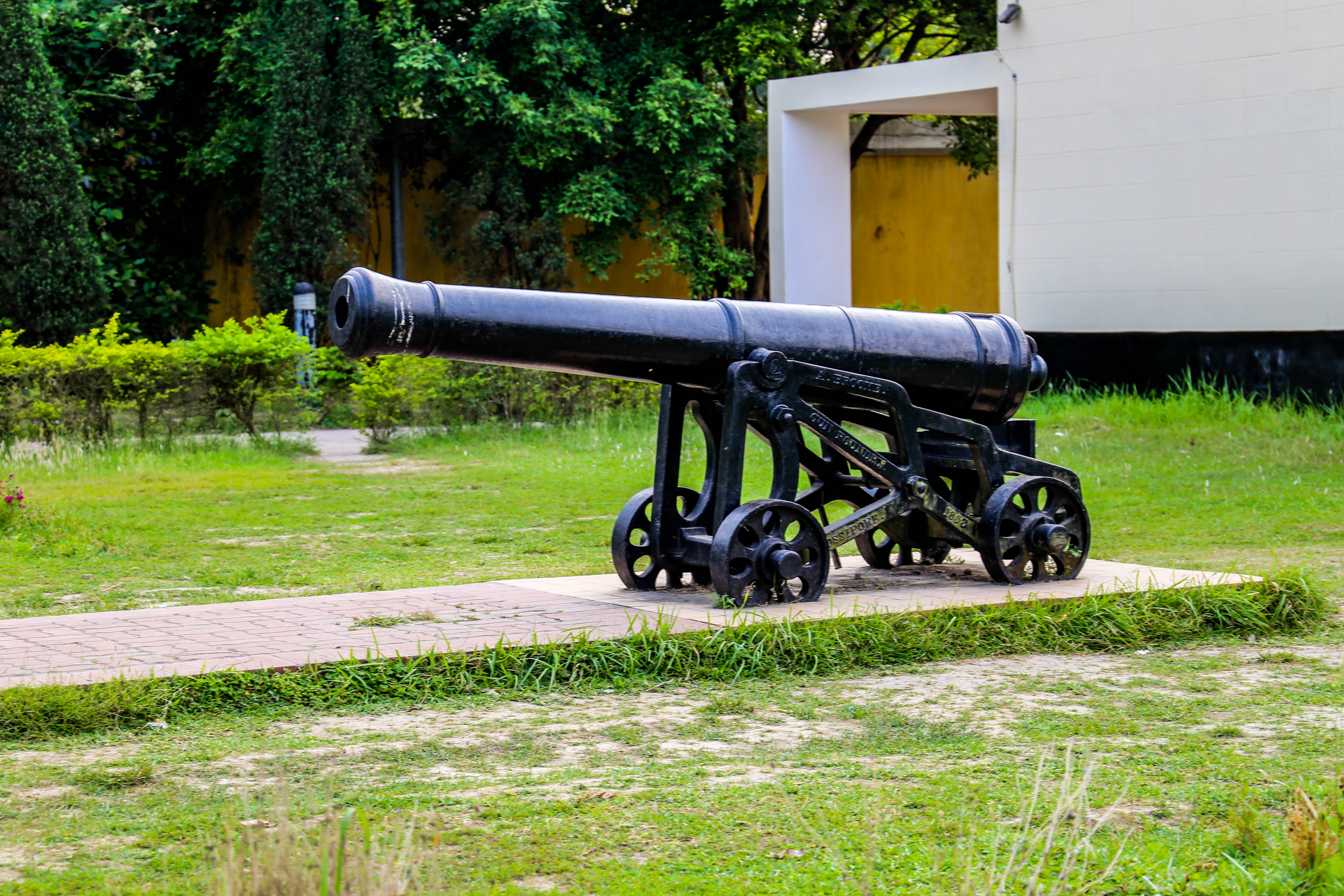
Historic cannon outside Ganabhaban

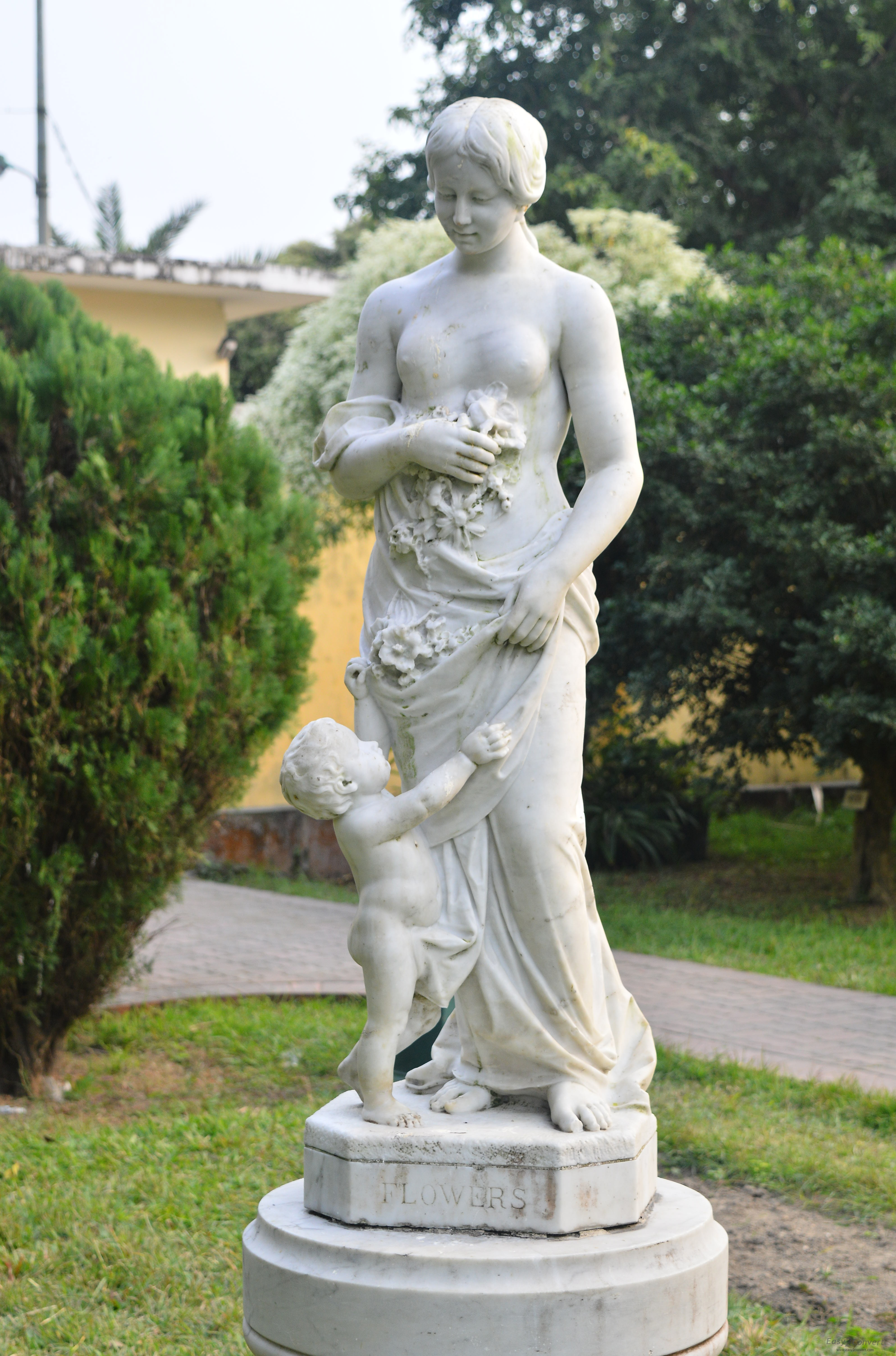
Statue in courtyard

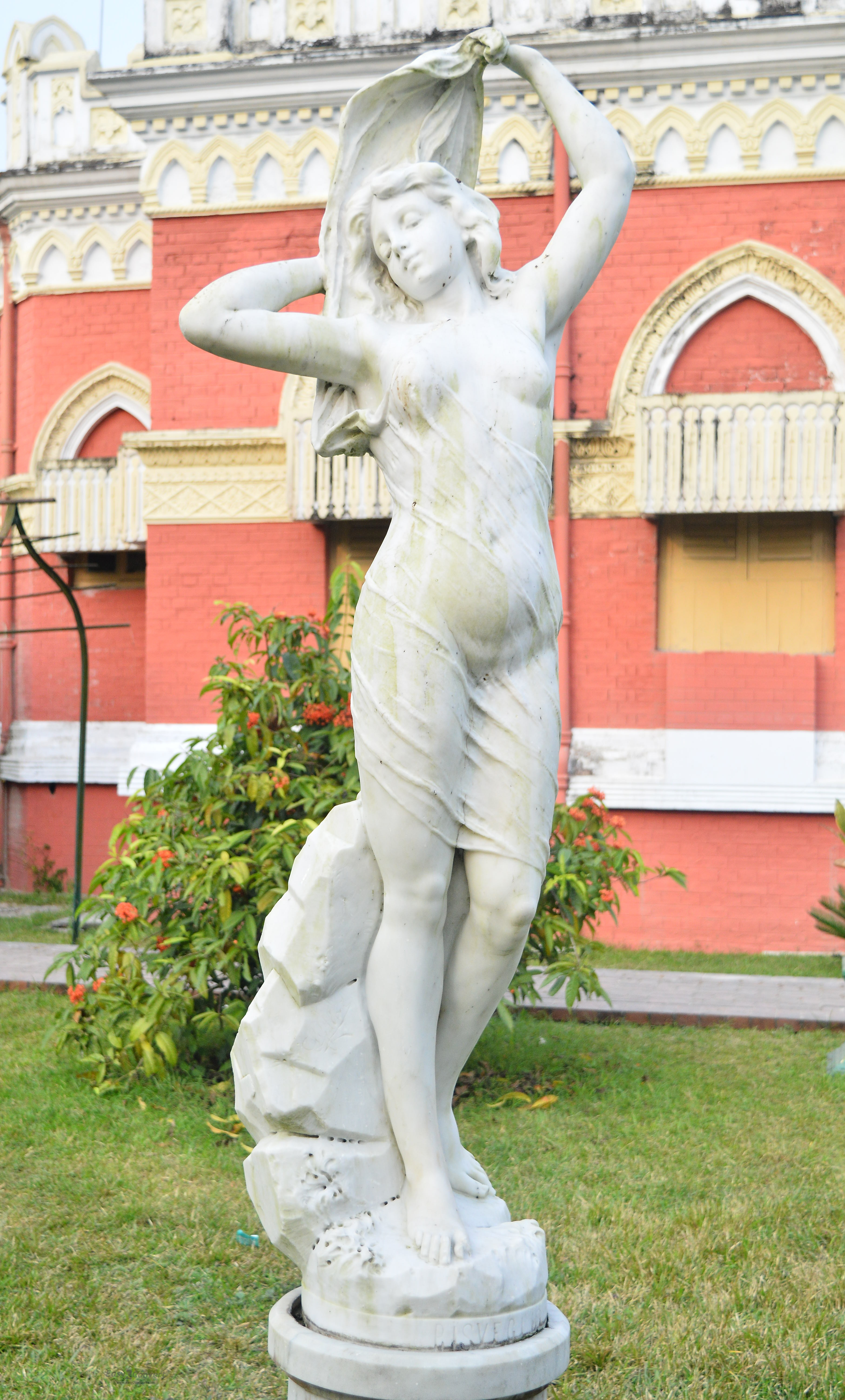
Statue in courtyard

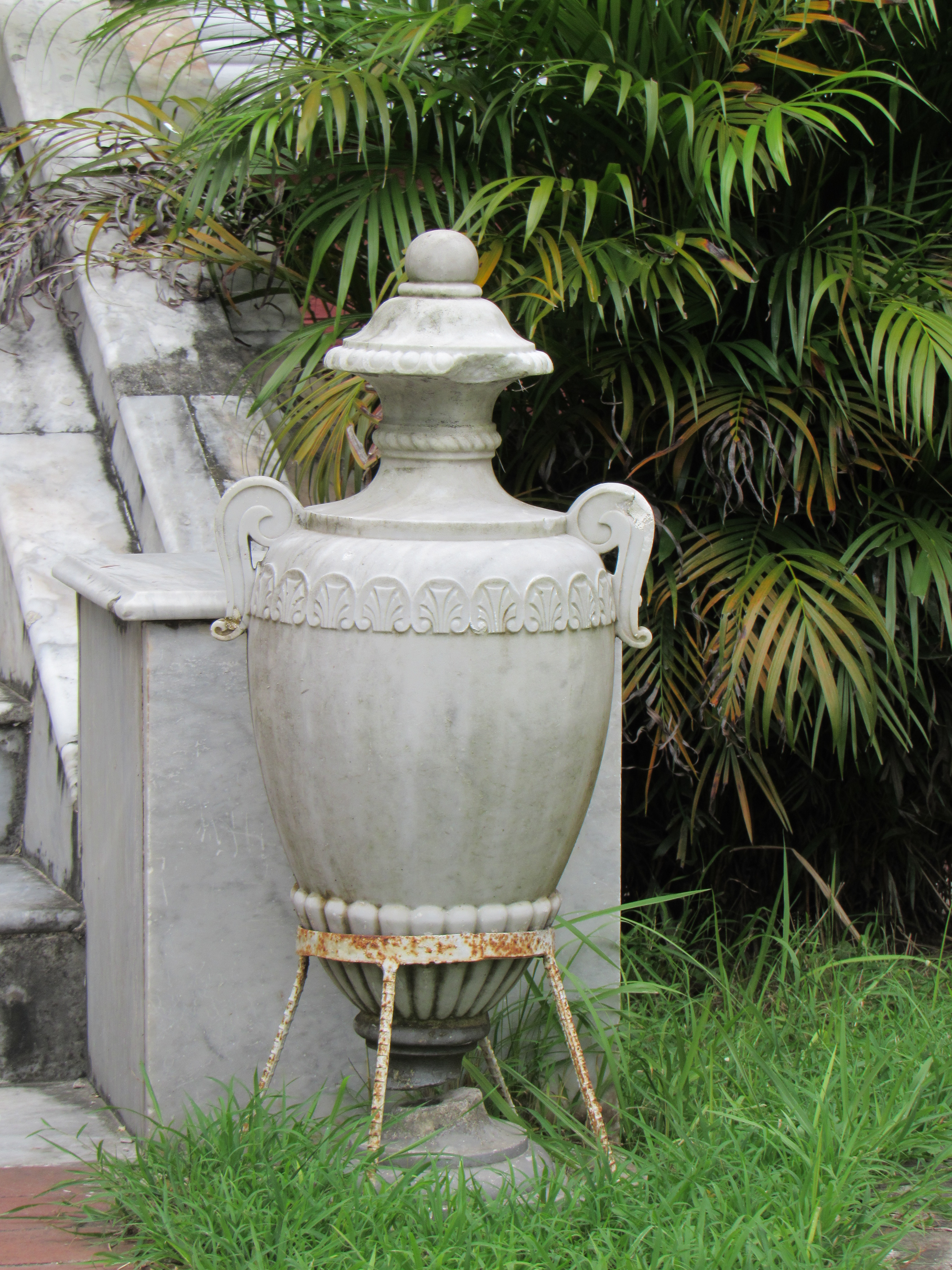
Decorative urn in Ganabhaban garden

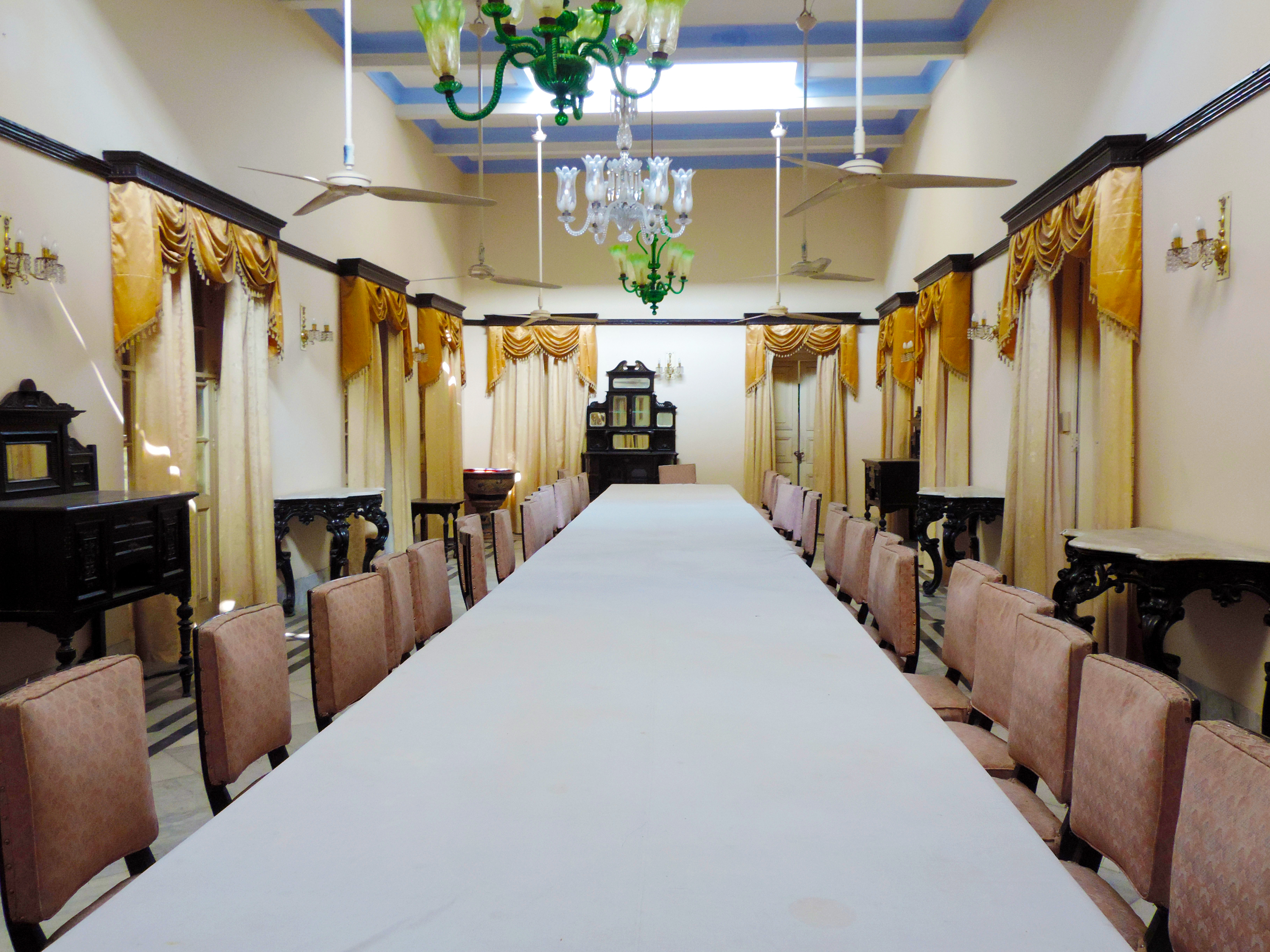
Ministerial conference chamber

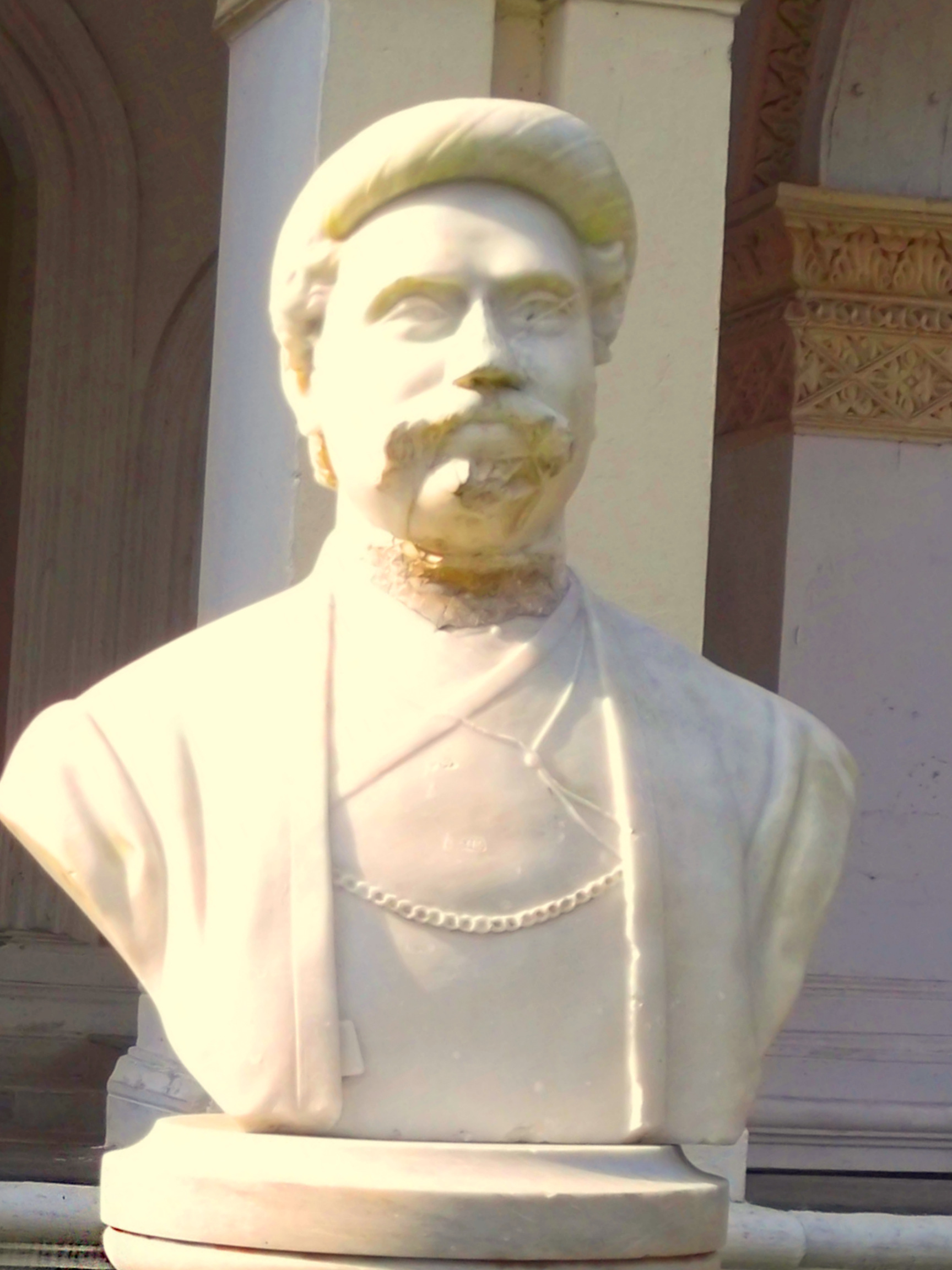
Bust of a former Raja

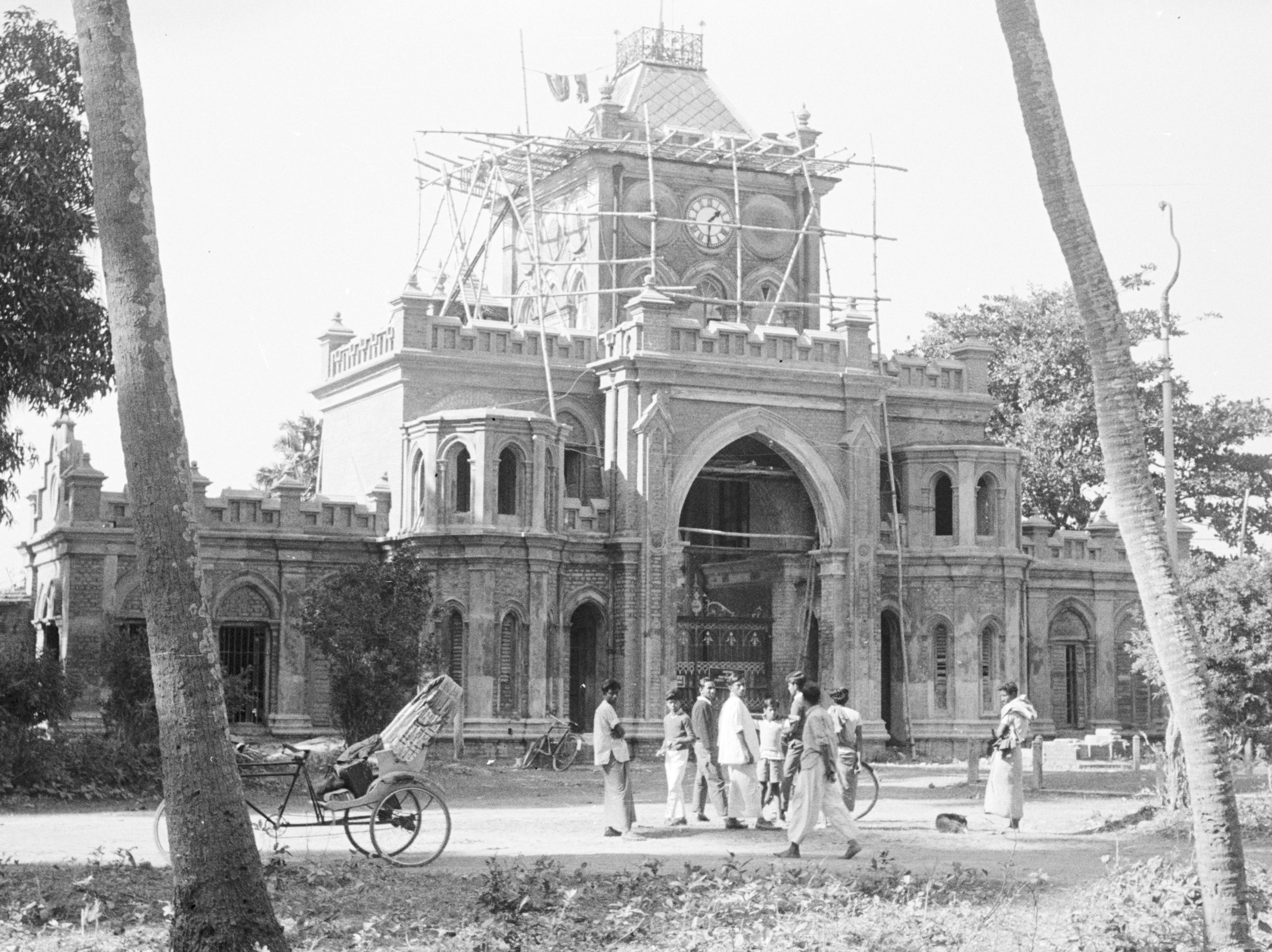
Renovation work at Uttara Ganabhaban, 1975

== See also ==
- Chequers Court
- List of archaeological sites in Bangladesh
