= Bengal Tenancy Act (1885) =

The Bengal Tenancy Act 1885 was an enactment of the Bengal government that defined the rights of zamindars lords and their tenants in response to a widespread peasant revolt. In "Pabna Revolts" or Pabna Agrarian Uprisings were actually mass meetings, strikes, and legal battles against exploitative zamindars that had started since 1870s.

== Eighteenth century ==
The Permanent settlement of 1793 gave absolute rights to the zamindars, who were hereditary landholders and ruled as such, but the rights of tenants were not defined. With time, in the nineteenth century, the land demand increased and the lords increased rents and land revenues. The Raiyots (tenants) refused to accept the zamindari rent increase beyond the customary rates.

This time period also saw a rise in the lesser-landed nobility (Chowdhurys and Taluqdars), whose existence did not fall under the Permanent Settlement laws. The Madhyasvatvas, as they were called (literally Subinfeudation), received their rights by purchase, and not by inheritance like the lords. The government tried to accommodate this class by enacting the Rent Act in 1859. But the issues remained.

== Nineteenth century ==
Peasant uprisings such as that in Pabna stemmed from poor relations between land owners and tenant farmers. The Rent Commission of the Bengal Legislative Council enacted the third Act of 1885 to define the rights and obligations of tenancies and thereby calm the unrest.

== See also ==
- Permanent Settlement Regulations of 1793
- East Bengal State Acquisition and Tenancy Act of 1950
