= Zamindars of Natore =

Aristocratic Bengali Zamindars

The zamindars of Natore were influential aristocratic Bengali zamindars (rent-receiving landholders), who owned large estates in what is today Natore District in Bangladesh.

They contributed to the development of East Bengal and later Bangladesh through philanthropy and patronage. Various educational institutions and civil associations were established through their support, two famous examples being, the University of Dacca, the first University of East Bengal and Varendra Research Museum in Rajshahi, the first Museum of East Bengal. The families also produced Prime Ministers, Ambassadors, Ministers, scholars, military officers and various other important figures. Members also received Knighthoods from the British colonial government as well as other titles.

== History ==
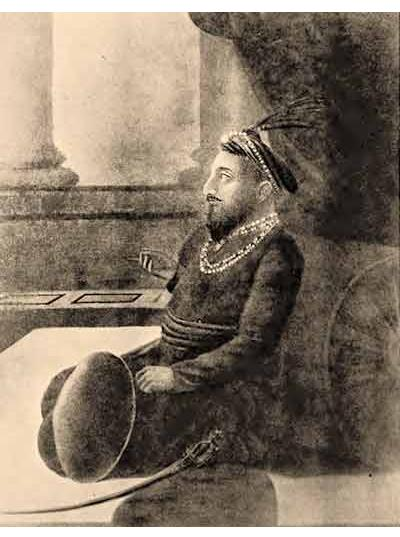
Murshid Quli Khan, the Nawab of Bengal under whom the zamindars of Natore served.

Chalan Beel, (a beel in Bengali denotes a large lake or marsh that fills up with water during the monsoons) was spread over a part of what is now Natore District. Legend has it that Raja (zamindar) Ramjivan Moitra was once travelling by boat searching for a suitable place to build his principal residence. While travelling through Chalan beel, he saw a snake that had caught a frog. Seeing this his learned pundits interpreted it as a sign that the end of his search had arrived and therefore told him that this should be the place of his residence. Whereupon the Raja called out to his boatmen: Nao Tharo, nao meaning 'boat', and tharo meaning 'stop' in Hindustani. From a corruption of this exclamation, the place eventually came to be called 'Nator'.

At first Natore was a beel whose name was Chaivhanga. In 1706 Raja Ramjivan Moitra established his capital here by filling the beel. Natore was the headquarters of the district of Rajshahi from 1793 to 1825 during east India company's rule. In 1825 the headquarters were moved to Rajshahi and in 1829 Natore became a subdivision of Rajshahi district. In 1845 Natore Mahukuma was established. Natore town became a municipality in 1869. More than a century later, in 1984, Natore subdivision was turned into a district in independent Bangladesh.

=== Background ===
During the times of the medieval kingdoms of India, rent was called rajasva (the king's share). The king's men used to collect rajasva from his subjects according to law, and none could be evicted if rajasva was paid regularly. Later, the Hindu 'rajasva' became 'jama' during Muslim rule of the Mughal Empire. However, the spirit of rajasva and jama remained the same. The cultivators had customary rights in land, which the sovereign honoured, as long as they paid revenue to the rulers. These revenues were supplied to the zamindars, officials of the empire, who created the feudalistic nobility. During the Mughal era (specifically during the rule of Emperor Aurangzeb), the mansabdari system, the military nobility, evolved into the aristocratic landed zamindari system.

=== Roles ===
Unlike the autonomous or frontier chiefs, the hereditary status of the zamindar class was circumscribed by the Mughal emperors, and the heir depended to a certain extent on the pleasure of the sovereign. Under the British Empire, the zamindars were to be subordinate to the crown and not act as hereditary lords, but at times family politics was at the heart of naming an heir. At times, a cousin could be named an heir with closer family relatives present. Even a lawfully wedded wife could inherit the zamindari if the ruling zamindar named her as an heir.

== Families ==
=== Maharajas of Natore and Rajshahi (North-western region) ===
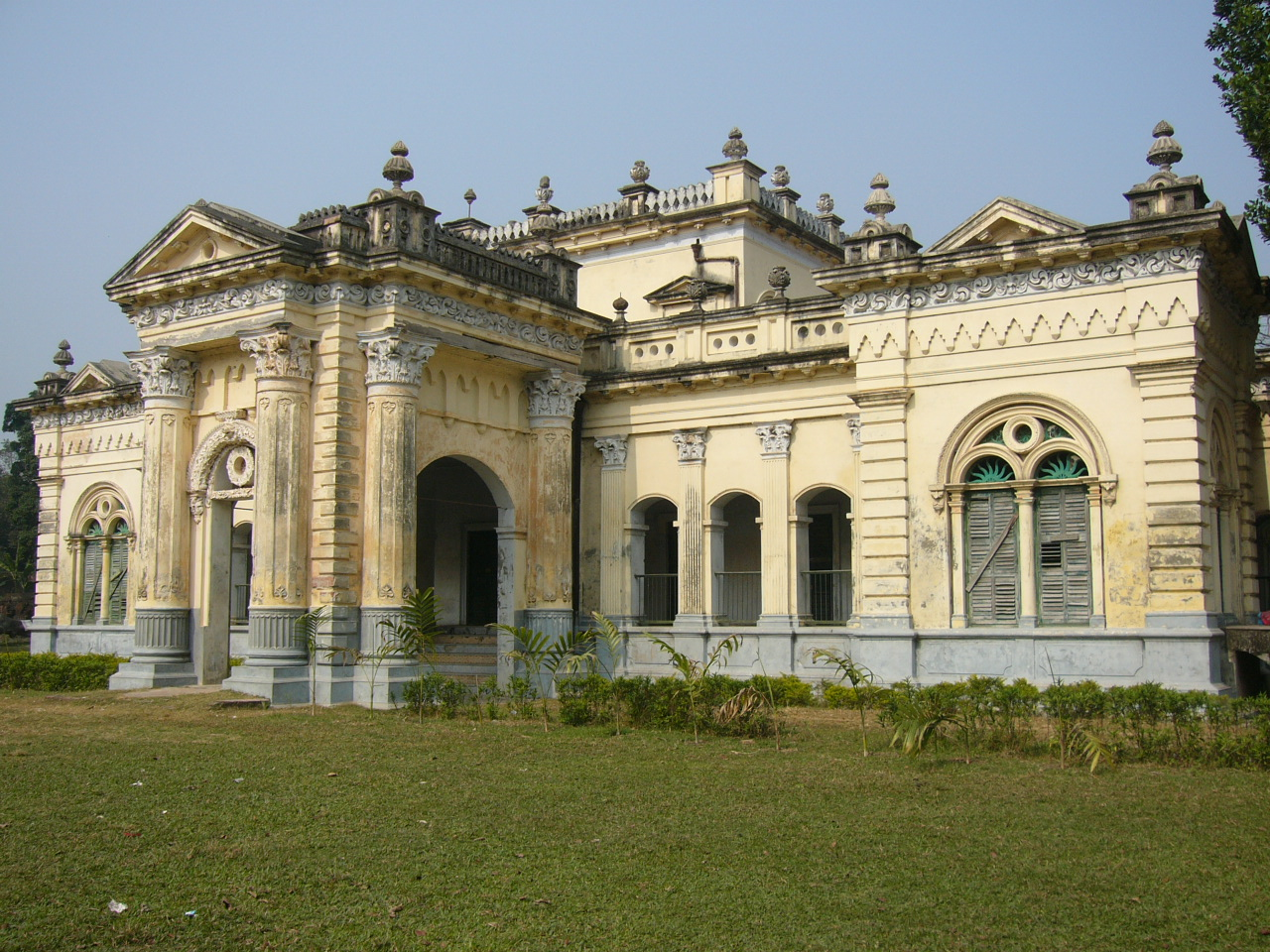
The ornate Natore Palace of the ruling family of Rajshahi in Natore, Rajshahi, Bangladesh.

Many old aristocrats and lords lost their estates during the rule of the Nawab Murshid Quli Khan. Besides, many zamindars lost their zamindari on account of their disobedience and rebellion. Murshid Quli Khan settled these zamindaries with his trusted followers. In this process of replacement, the most fortunate beneficiary was the Rajshahi zamindari. The family also benefited from another feature of the nawab's revenue policy of encouragement to the formation of big zamindaries.

The Rajshahi Raj family traced its origin to Kamdev Moitra, a tahsildar of the Puthia Raj family. Kamdev had three sons: Ramjivan, Raghunandan, and Bishnuram. Raghunandan was very promising and enterprising. Raja Darpanarain, the zamindar of Puthia, and Murshid Quli Khan had significant contributions behind Raghunandan's rise to prominence. Raghunandan sided with Murshid Quli Khan in his entanglement with the Subahdar, the Prince Azim-us-Shan, the grandson of Emperor Aurangzeb, and thus won the confidence of the nawab.

Again, when the diwani was transferred to Murshidabad, he was appointed in a similar capacity as his master's representative there. During this time he came in close contact with Murshid Quli Khan and secured his confidence. Which is why the naib (later ruler of Bengal) trusted him and let him set up the dynasty. Just a few zamindars controlled half of the total landed property of Bengal, and in 1793 the British East India Company abolished Nizamat (local rule by nawabs appointed by the Mughal emperor) and took complete control of the province of Bengal. The colonial state viewed these princely zamindaris as potential threats to the security of the new state because their power was so great that they could, at any opportune moment, combine and put the colonial state in great jeopardy. Hence it became a policy of the government to weaken these estates, if not destroy them altogether. One of the strategies to implement this design was the ruthless operation of the sunset law (a law that required the lords to submit their revenues by sunset).

=== Rajas of Dighapatia (South-eastern region) ===
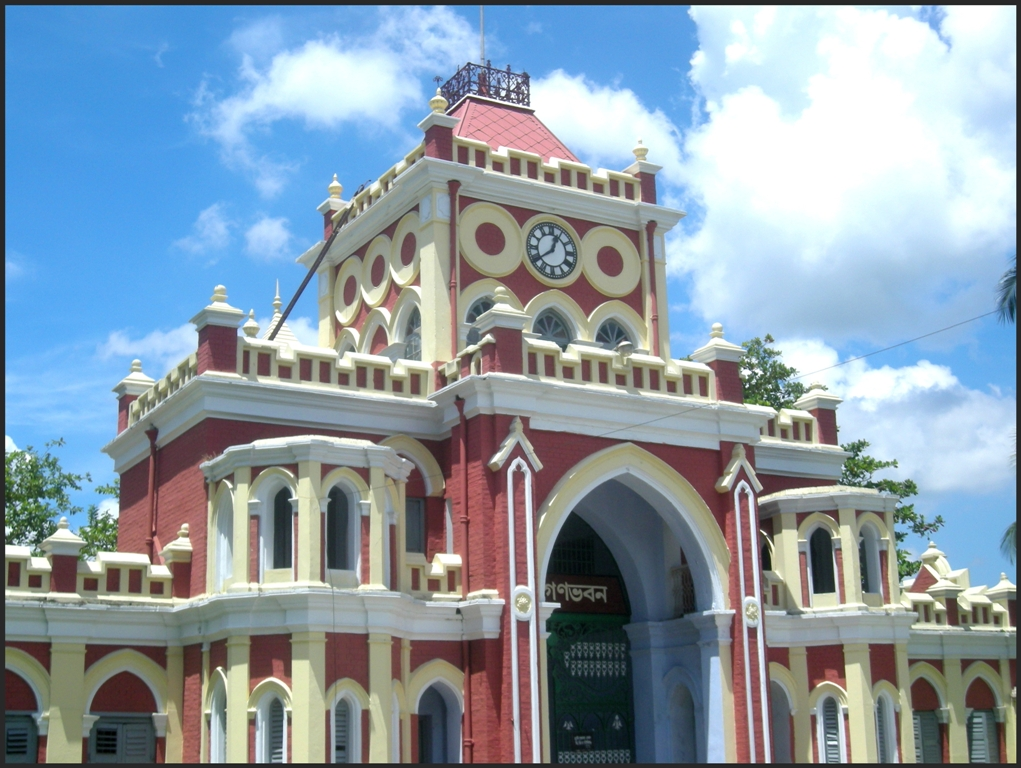
The entrance of the Grand Dighapatia Palace.

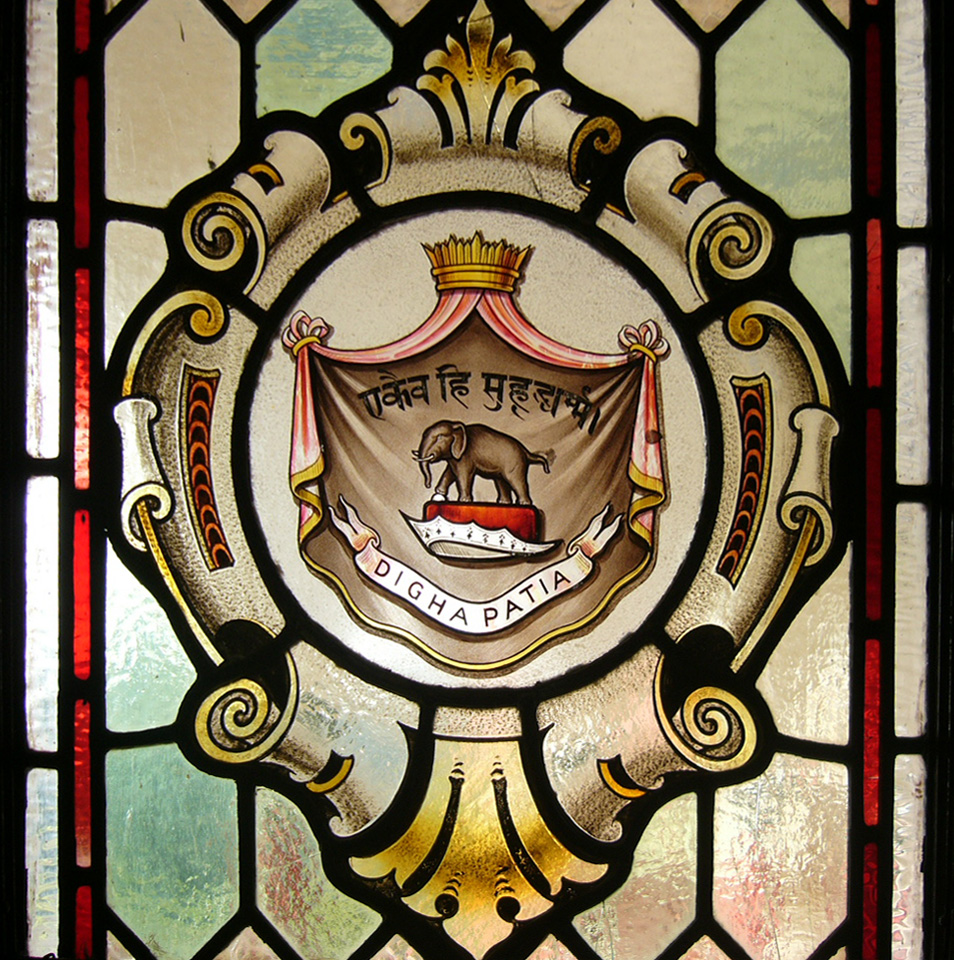
Coat of arms of the Maharaja (Zamindar) of Dighapatia in Natore.

The first Raja was Dayaram Roy, who, at a very young age, received help from Raja Ramjivan Roy, the first Raja of the Natore Raj family, and eventually became his dewan. Raja Dayaram led the army of Raja Ramjivan in aid of the Nawab of Bengal in 1716 and overthrew the rebellious Raja Sitaram Ray, who was a zamindar (and later king, or Raja) of neighbouring Bhusna state. The sack of Muhammadpur, Raja Sitaram's capital, later enabled him to ultimately lay the foundation of the Dighapatia dynasty. For his loyalty, he received large tracts of land in Rajshahi and Jessore as grants and later acquired zamindari in Bogra and Mymensingh.

Nawab Murshid Quli Khan, who was the nawab of Bengal under Emperor Aurangzeb ,conferred on him the title of 'Rai-Raiyan' in recognition of his services. When the Earl Cornwallis of the East India Company, who were given the right to collect revenue from the province of Bengal, introduced the Permanent Settlement Act to increase revenue collection, many of the old feudal lords and zamindars created during the time of the Nawab Murshid Quli Khan could not meet land revenue standards and thus became defaulters. Their estates were sold to a new class of wealthy lords. The Dighapatia Raj was one of the few remnants of the old decaying 'jagirdars'. They were avidly following European dress, wine, horse races, and various such other external glamours of life.

=== Rajas and Zamindars of Puthia (Western Region of Natore) ===
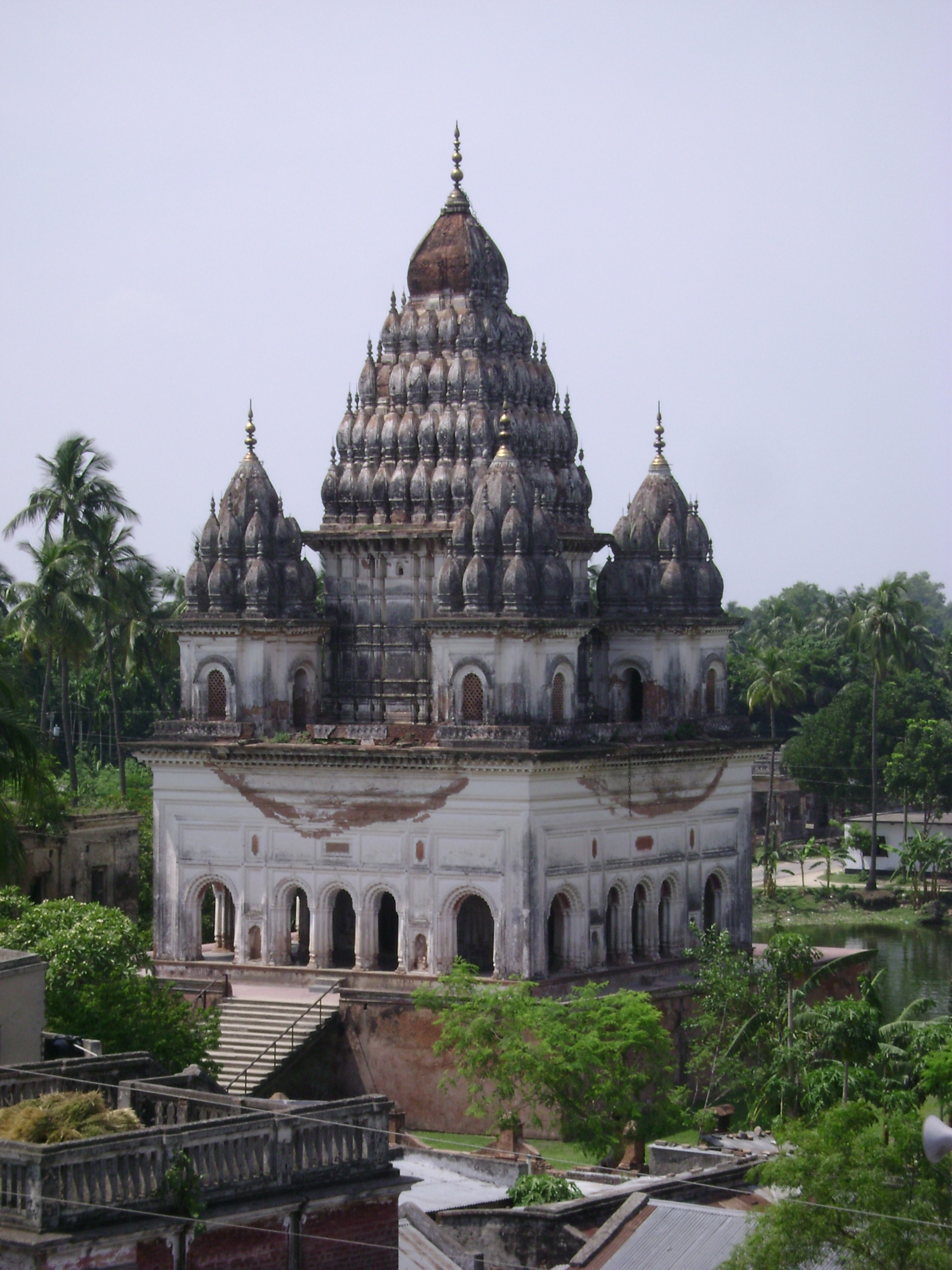
The Shiva Temple at Puthia

The Puthia Raj family, created by the Mughal Emperors in the early seventeenth century, is one of the oldest feudal estates of Bengal. A lord named Nilambar received the title of Raja (King) from the Emperor Jahangir (1605–1627 AD). In 1744, the region was divided between King Nilambar's sons, and the Puthia Raj family was born. The family built lavish palaces and temples, such as the Puthia Temple Complex, and were noted philanthropists. The temple complex consists of a cluster of notable old Hindu temples in Puthia Upazila, Rajshahi Division, Bangladesh. Located 23 km to the east of Rajshahi city, it has the largest number of historic temples in Bangladesh. The temples have been built in terracotta in a variety of styles, combining the typical Jor Bangla architecture with other influences. The Rajbari, or Palace of the Raja of Puthia, is part of the complex.

The grandest temple in Puthia, the Govinda Temple, was erected in the mid-nineteenth century by the queen of Puthia. The temple is dedicated to Lord Krishna, as the Puthians were converted to Vaishnavism by Radhamohana Thakura. The temple has exquisite terracotta ornamentation depicting the divine romance between Krishna and Radha. This temple, built in 1815 by the queen of Puthia and dedicated to the Hindu god Shiva, is the largest Shiva temple in Bangladesh. The corridors have a touch of Jaipur architecture, and in the sanctuary lies a very large black basalt Shiva Linga, one of the largest in the country.

=== Zamindars of Singra (North-eastern Region) ===
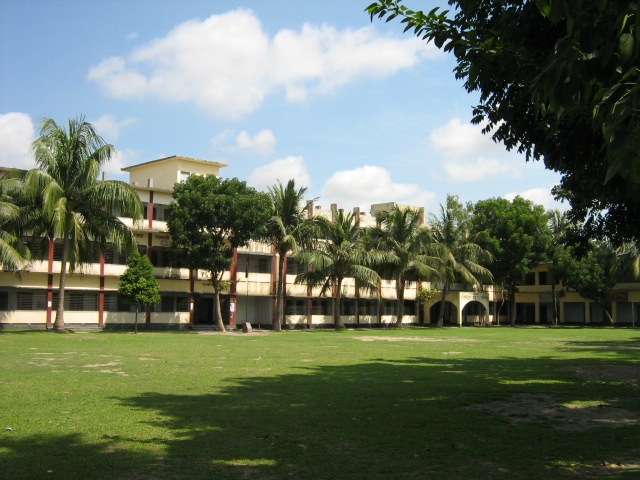
Present-day Goleafroz College in the Singranatore Estate

One of the few Muslim zamindars in the region at a time when the territories were mainly ruled by the Hindu raj families (royal families), the Singra Zamindari family, or Singranatore Zamindars, were descended from former mansabdars as hereditary Mirzas; a cadet branch of the Imperial family of India, they descended from a Perso-Turkic dynasty. It is a common misconception that the family gets the name from their estates and land holdings in the upazila of Singra of Natore district, while in reality, they are named after both upazilas of Singra and Natore of the district in Rajshahi Division.

During the fall of the Rajshahi Raj family, the clan gained considerable tracts of land in their estates and functioned as vassal chiefs to the Maharajas of Dighapatia. Due to their religion, they were favoured by the Administration of Islamic East Pakistan (1948–1971) and then Bangladesh. They wielded significant influence in the area and founded educational institutions such as Gole Afroz College and Rahmat Iqbal College, as well as being involved in regional governance and politics.

Karchamaria, Singra

Other zamindars in Singra included British-Indian aristocrat and historian Sir Jadunath Sarkar, who received the Order of the Indian Empire in 1929 from King George V.

=== Nawabs of Bogra and Dhanbari ===
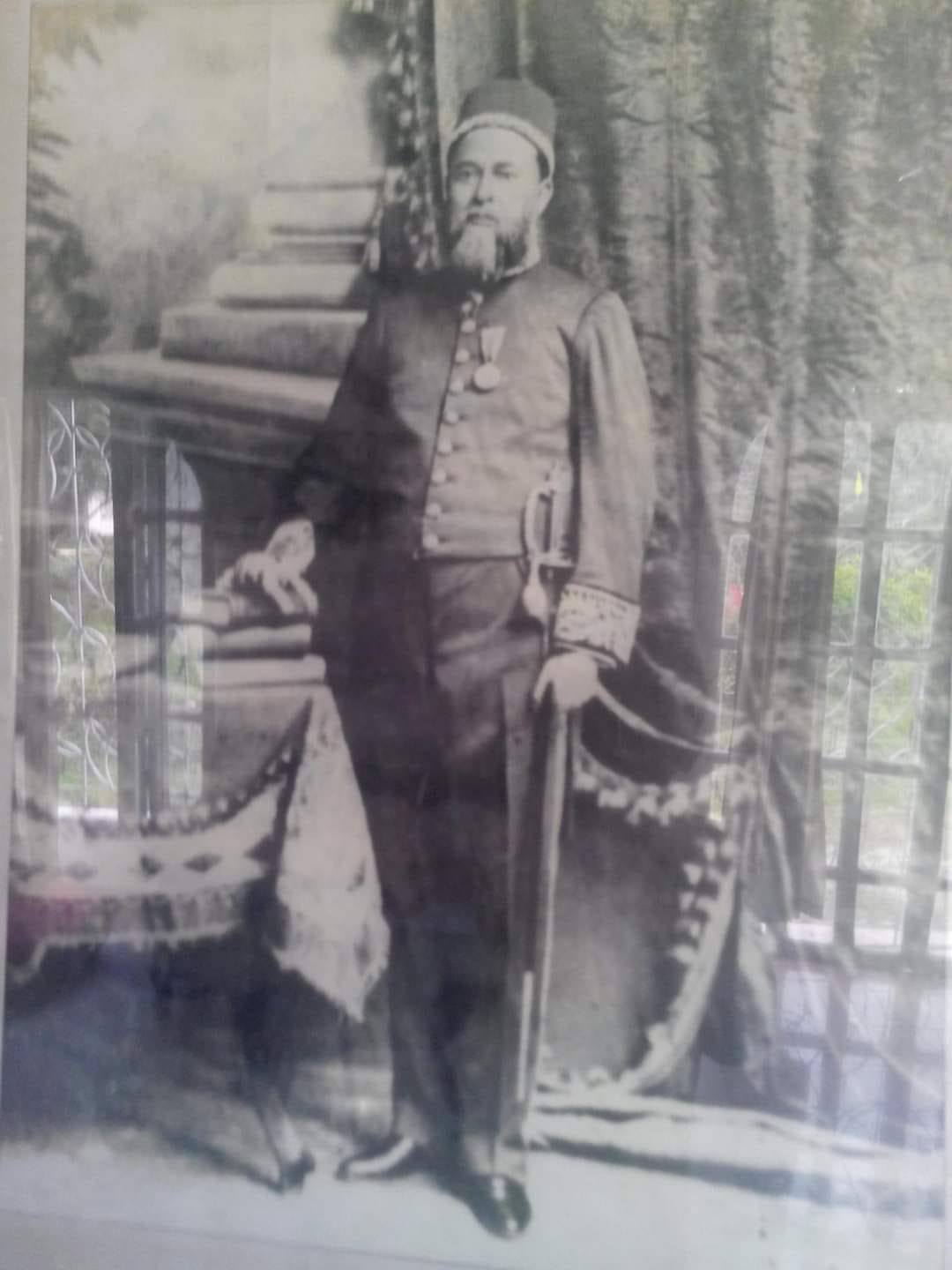
Nawab Ali Chowdhury, the grandson of the Zamindar of Natore, was influential in the development of East Bengal.

Located beyond the Northern Frontiers of Natore, eminent aristocrats such as Nawab Bahadur Syed Nawab Ali Chowdhury, grandson of a Zamindar of Natore, were credited with early development of the region. Nawab Ali Chowdhury had made a valuable contribution to the establishment of the University of Dhaka (1921). Dhaka University came into being under a central government act, and it was Nawab Ali, a key member of the Muslim League, who piloted the Dhaka University Bill in the Imperial Legislative Assembly. After the establishment of the university, he played an important role in framing its rules and regulations and in sustaining the university when it faced financial and other difficulties during its formative period. Syed Nawab Ali Chowdhury had been conferred upon with the titles of Khan Bahadur in 1906, Nawab in 1911, Commander of the Order of the Indian Empire in 1918, and Nawab Bahadur in 1924 by the British Government. Nawab Ali's most famous grandson, the Nawabzada, Muhammad Ali Bogra, was Pakistan Ambassador to the United States, health minister, finance minister, then foreign minister of Pakistan, minister of defence and finally the third prime minister of Pakistan. He was one of the core and principal founding fathers of the current and modern state of Pakistan, responsible for leading the Muslim League in East Pakistan, in charge of the party's foreign directorate.

== Legacy ==
Besides continued regional governance and economic development, the zamindars of Natore started major works that were monumental for Bengal. Excavation of Somapura Mahavihara, the 1985 UNESCO World Heritage Site, was started by societies and institutions founded by the zamindars. The oldest multi-disciplinary research university, where Satyendranath Bose published his works defining the Bose–Einstein condensate with Albert Einstein, was also one such institute that survives to this day.

== Abolition ==
The East Bengal State Acquisition and Tenancy Act of 1950 was drafted on 31 March 1948, during the after the fall of the British Monarchy in India, and passed on 16 May 1951. Before passage of the legislature, landed revenue laws of Bengal consisted of the Permanent Settlement of 1793 and the Bengal Tenancy Act of 1885.

The 1793 legislature created a landed aristocracy that was supposed to be loyal to the British Empire. The Act of 1885 defined the rights and liabilities of the ryats (peasants) in relation to their superior lords (zamindars). After the British left in 1947, the law abolished the zamindari system in the region, after which the lands of the state were under the federal government. It was seen as a democratic move to a people's state rather than a feudal class system.

In consequence of the introduction of the law, no intermediary interests were present between the government and its people; the government has become the only lord, and the cultivators were relieved of the baneful effect of subinfeudation. The zamindari families were partly reimbursed for their losses during the exchange of land ownership after a few battles in court. The rule of zamindars was substituted by a hierarchy of officials with the Board of Land Administration, with assistant commissioners, collectors and deputy commissioner etc. A collector or deputy commissioner is assisted by one additional deputy commissioner for revenue, one revenue deputy collector, and a number of other governmental officials.
