= Rahmat Iqbal College =

Rahmat Iqbal honours College
- রহমত ইকবাল কলেজ

Location
- Singra natore, Rajshahi; Bangladesh
- Coordinates: 24°30′N 88°59′E

Information
- Type: Public since 1990
- Founder: Singranatore family
- Locale: Bamihal
- School board: Rajshahi Education Board
- School district: Natore
- Authority: Bangladesh Board
- Faculty: 60
- Grades: Upper secondary and collegiate
- Graduates: honours

Rahmat Iqbal College also called Rahmat Iqbal Degree College is a private college in Bamihal, Natore in Bangladesh. It is situated by the Rajshahi-Bogra Highway. It offers secondary education to its local students.
