= Gole Afroz College =

Gole Afroze Government Degree College
- গোল আফ্রোজ সরকারি ডিগ্রি কলেজ
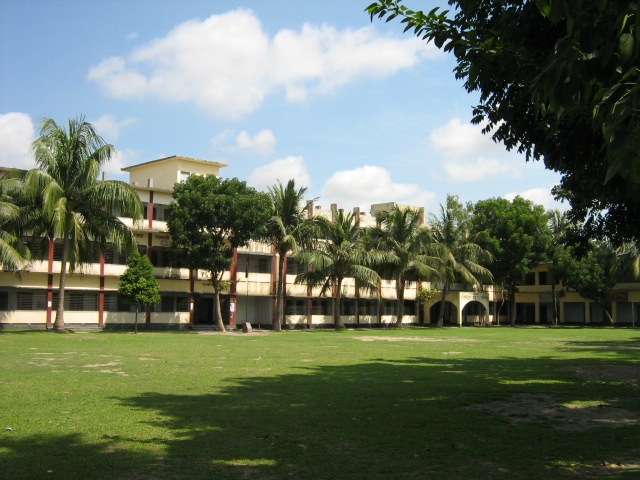

Location
- Singra, Natore Rajshahi; Bangladesh
- Coordinates: 24°30′N 88°59′E

Information
- Type: Public since 1986
- Motto: Poro tomar rober nam-e (Learn in the name of your lord)
- Religious affiliation: Islam (Sunni)
- Established: 1970 Pakistan; Made Public in 1986 Bangladesh
- Founder: Singranatore family
- School board: Rajshahi Education Board
- Educational authority: Bangladesh Board
- Grades: Upper secondary and collegiate
- Website: http://gagc.edu.bd/

Gol-e-Afroze Government College, also called Gule Afroze Degree College, is the only public residential, coeducational, institute of higher learning of Singra in Natore, Bangladesh. It is one of the five government colleges in the Natore District, and the third oldest, established before the War of 1971 and the Independence of the country. Although it was a private college of the aristocratic Singranatore family, in 1986, the then President and former military ruler, HM Ershad announced that it would be made into a public college. Since then it is under the Ministry of Education of the Government of Bangladesh.

== History ==
It is named after Begum Gole Afroz, a member of the Singranatore family of Rajshahi, the daughter of Gulbadan Begum of Natore and Shamezuddin Ahmed. She was a granddaughter of Mirza Jalaluddin, the last zamindar of Natore and the wife of MM Rahmatullah.

== Gallery ==
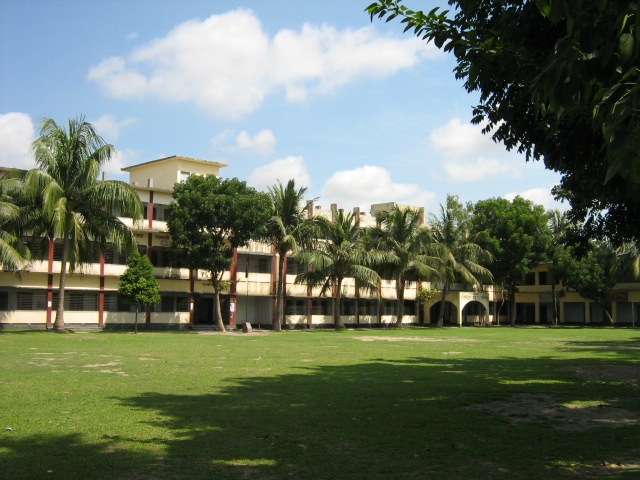

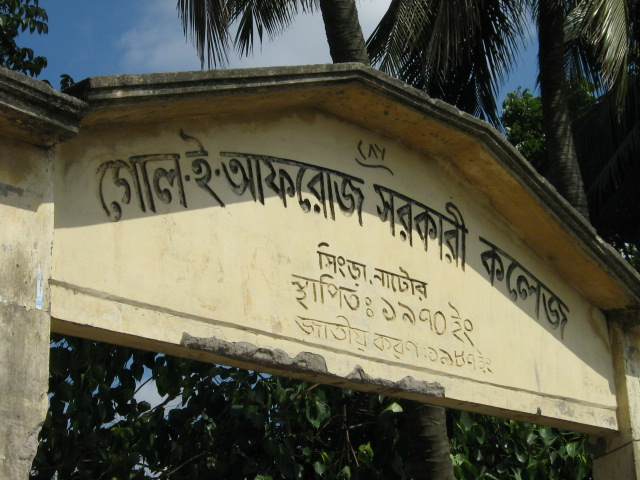

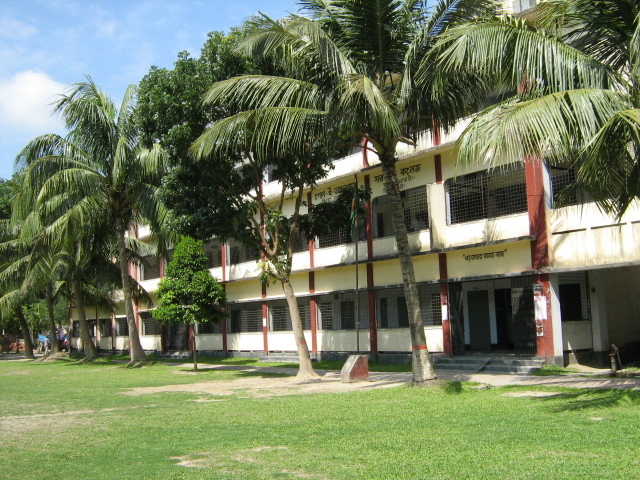

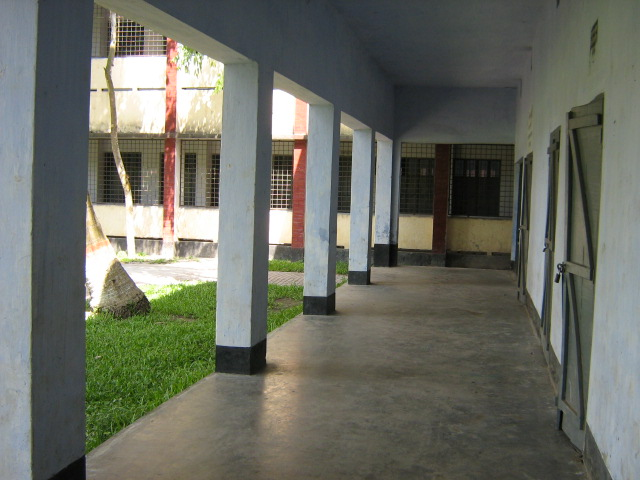

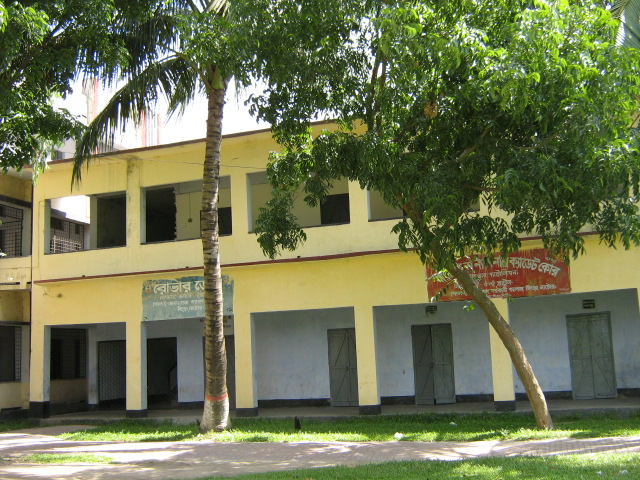
