= East Bengal State Acquisition and Tenancy Act of 1950 =

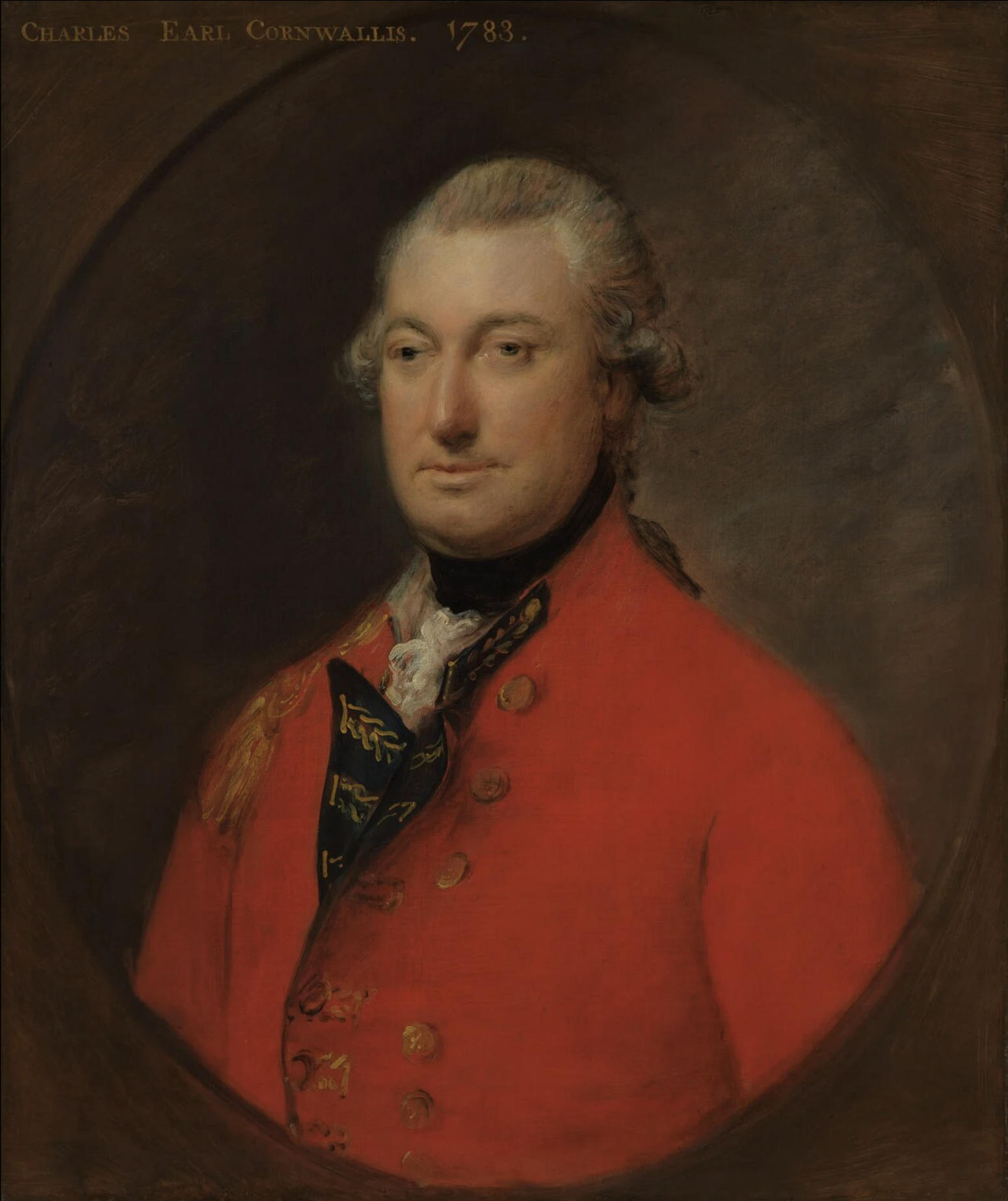
Lord Cornwallis made the Permanent Settlement Act of 1793 in Bengal which led to the zamindars gaining influence as the ruling class.

The East Bengal State Acquisition and Tenancy Act of 1950 was a law passed by the newly formed democratic Government of East Bengal in the Dominion of Pakistan (present day Bangladesh). The bill was drafted on 31 March 1948 during the early years of Pakistan and passed on 16 May 1951. Before passage of the legislature, landed revenue laws of Bengal consisted of the Permanent Settlement Regulations of 1793 and the Bengal Tenancy Act of 1885.

The 1793 legislature created a landed aristocracy (see: Zamindars of Bengal) which was supposed to be loyal to the British Empire. The Act of 1885 defined the rights and liabilities of the peasants (ryats) in relation to their superior lords (Zamindars). After the end of the British rule in 1947, the law abolished the Zamindari system in the region, after which the lands of the state were under the federal government. It was seen as a democratic move to a people's state rather than a feudal class system. After East Bengal, India adopted a similar law in 1953 in the Constitution of India. In modern Pakistan, such reforms were never carried out, which is why the effects of feudalism has perpetrated national politics and governance.

== History ==
During the times of the Middle Kingdoms of India rent was called rajasva (the King's share). The king's men used to collect rajasva from his subjects according to law, and none could be evicted if rajasva was paid regularly. Later, the Hindu 'rajasva' became 'jama' during Muslim rule of the Mughal Empire. However, the spirit of rajasva and jama remained the same. The cultivators had customary rights in land which the sovereign honoured, as long as they paid revenue to the rulers. These revenues were supplied to the zamindars, officials of the empire, who created the feudalistic nobility. During the mughal era (specifically during the rule of Emperor Aurangzeb), the mansabdari system, the military nobility evolved into the aristocratic landed zamindari system.

During the British rule, the zamindars became equivalents of the landed aristocracy of Britain. in 1793, the zamindars were created absolute owners of the estates, and not just representatives of the sovereign rulers

== Abolishing the system ==
The Act comprises 152 sections divided into five parts and 19 chapters. In consequence of introduction of the law, no intermediary interest were present between the Government and its people, the government has become the only lord and the cultivators were relieved of the baneful effect of subinfeudation. The zamindari families were partly reimbursed for their losses during the exchange of land ownership after a few battles in court. The rule of zamindars were substituted by a hierarchy of officials with the Board of Land Administration with Assistant commissioners, collectors and Deputy Commissioner etc. A collector or deputy commissioner is assisted by one additional deputy commissioner for revenue, one revenue deputy collector, and a number of other governmental officials.

Families like the Dhaka Nawab family, the Prithimpassa Nawab family, the Rajshahi Raj family, the Dighapatia Raj family, the Puthia Raj family, the Singranatore family and thousands of others were legally abolished and relieved of centuries of duties, rights, and titles. However, in the Chittagong Hill Tracts region, the law was not applicable, which is why Tridev Roy and Debashish Roy still held on to their Chakma royal titles of Raja (King), Rani (Queen) and Rajkumar (Prince), while the former families lost theirs. As the majority of zamindars in East Bengal happened to be Hindus, the passage of the act in the backdrop of the 1950 riots caused many of them to migrate to India.

== 1950s ==
Elsewhere in the former Indian Empire, most of the princely states in the western part of empire (Pakistan) merged into the province of West Pakistan on 14 October 1955 and the new nation was declared a republic within a year even though some of the frontier states continued to be administered as separate units. During 1948–1950, some of the remaining princely states joined India, and the Indian zamindaris were also abolished. In return for surrendering the government of their states in the case of princes, and estates in the case of zamindars, together with their revenues and military forces, the former ruling princes were guaranteed their hereditary styles and titles, certain privileges of rank and honour, as well as privy purses to cover the living expenses of themselves and their families. However, this too was abolished in 1956.

== 1970s ==
In 1971, the styles and titles enjoyed by the former ruling families ceased to be officially recognised by the Government of Pakistan in January 1972. Coincidentally, that year was also the year of independence of East Pakistan into Bangladesh. In Pakistan, however, most of the formerly ruling families continued to exercise significant influence and considerable political and economic power. After a year-long debate, in India, an amendment to the Constitution at the end of 1971 abolished the privy purses, guaranteed by the Indian Constitution and eliminated the princely order itself.

== See also ==
- Ryotwari
- Feudalism
- Princely States
- Manorialism
- Raja
- Maharaja
- Nawab
- Landed property
- Mirza
- Manorialism
- Medieval demography
- Middle Ages
- Quia Emptores
- Serfdom
- Statutes of Mortmain
- Vassal
- Feudalism in England
- Protofeudalism
