= Pabna Peasant Uprisings =

Pabna Peasant Uprising (1873–76) was a resistance movement by the peasants ("Ryots") against the lords of the lands in Bengal ("zamindars") in the Yusufshahi pargana (now the Sirajganj District, Bangladesh) in Pabna. It was led by Ishan Chandra Roy, also known as "Bidrohi Raja"(বিদ্রোহী রাজা) or in English "Rebel King". It was supported by intellectuals such as R.C. Dutt, Surendranath Banerjee, Bankim Chandra Chatterjee, etc. It was overall a peaceful movement.

== Events ==
Some lords forcefully collected rents and land taxes, often enhanced for the poor peasants and also prevented the tenants from acquiring Occupancy Right under Act X of 1859. This Act conferred occupancy rights on tenants who held land for 12 years as well as paid their rents. But zamindars didn't want this to happen. The peasants were often evicted from the land due to non payment. The lords who gained parts of the Natore Raj frequently conducted violent act in order to gain more money. Due to the decline in the production of Jute in the 1870s, the peasants were struggling with famine. Some of the lords declared an enhancement of land taxes and that triggered the rebellion. Some peasants declared their parganas independent of zamindari control and tried setting up a local government with an "army" to fight the zamindari "lathials" or police. Deputies were placed in charge of the rebel army and were stationed at different parts of the district.

When the Pabna Raiyats' League (created in May 1873) activities threatened public peace, the government intervened to restore peace. In a proclamation of 4 July 1873 Sir George campbell, the then Lieutenant Governor of Bengal, guaranteed British government support of peasants against excessive zamindar demands, and advised the zamindars to assert their claims by legal means only. In the face of police action and additional famine that broke out in 1873–74, the rebellion subsided.

== See also ==
- Indigo revolt
