= Protofeudalism =

Early precursors of feudalism

Protofeudalism (Spanish: protofeudalismo / feudalismo prematuro) is a concept in medieval history, especially the history of Spain, according to which the direct precursors of feudalism can be found in Late Antiquity.

== Historiographical context ==
Spanish historiography relies heavily on the concept and projects it onto the late Visigothic Kingdom, but its usage is generally deprecated in the English-language historiography of Spain (or anywhere else). The current tendency in English scholarship to downplay feudalism and reduce the usage of related terminology, especially its application to the Early Middle Ages, is in direct conflict with recent trends in Spanish historiography to push the start of feudalism back into the Visigothic period, sometimes seen as part of a tendency to "Europeanise" Spanish history.

Interest was renewed in the history of a united Visigothic Spain during the dictatorship of Francisco Franco in the mid-20th century. The perennial need to explain the rapid downfall of the Visigothic kingdom in the face of Arab invasions led some scholars to postulate the increased privatisation of public authority in the hands of regional, landed nobility: twin tendencies, called "protofeudalism" (privatisation) and "particularism" (regionalism).

Typically, the protofeudal phenomenon is dated to the late 7th century, but sometimes earlier. In 1967, the Spanish historian Claudio Sánchez-Albornoz traced the protofeudalisation (protofeudalización) of the Visigothic army at least to the legislation of Erwig and Wamba. A description in English of the general phenomenon is given by Payne in his general history of Iberia in two volumes:

Decentralization was unavoidable, and power became a matter of personal relationship and example. The chief lieutenants of the crown were rewarded for their services by salaries or stipendia in the form of overlordship of land or temporary assignment of income from land held in precarium, that is, on a nominally revocable basis. This system was actually first used by the church to support local establishments, and by the seventh century was widely employed by the crown and also by the magnates (the high aristocracy) to pay their chief supporters and military retainers. The process of protofeudalization inevitably carried with it a splintering of juridical and economic sovereignty that further weakened political unity.

== Criticism ==
French historian Céline Martin has disputed the reality of "protofeudalism" by pointing to the public nature of oaths of fidelity in the late Visigothic kingdom, where oaths were generally sworn by (local) populations and not by individual men to individual lords. Roger Collins has criticised the concept as little more than an attempt by Spanish academics to integrate Spanish history into that of Europe in general. Collins cites L. García Moreno as proclaiming "international unanimity in applying the adjective 'protofeudal' to the socio-political formation incarnated by the Kingdom of Toledo at the beginning of the eighth century". Collins, however, "thinks not". Michael Kulikowski cites the discovery of mid-7th-century trientes at El Bovalar as evidence for commercial activity in central Spain refuting the prevailing notion of "autarky" and protofeudal serfdom.
