= Madhyasvatva =

Madhyasvatva (literally meaning "Subinfeudation") was a term used to denote the intermediate rights (lesser nobles, or tributaries to higher-ranking lords) that developed in Bengal following the Permanent Settlement Act of 1793 by Lord Cornwallis.

The "zamindars" (or feudal lords) created new offices and rights in between themselves and the peasants or the "Ryots". This practice of land ownership has been described by the nineteenth century revenue surveyors as having similarities with European feudalism of pre-modern times.

The "taluqdars" rose during this stage in Bengal and in a few generations transformed into petty aristocrats.
