= Dighapatia Raj =

Indian Zamindari Dynasty

Coordinates: 24.440°N 89.010°E

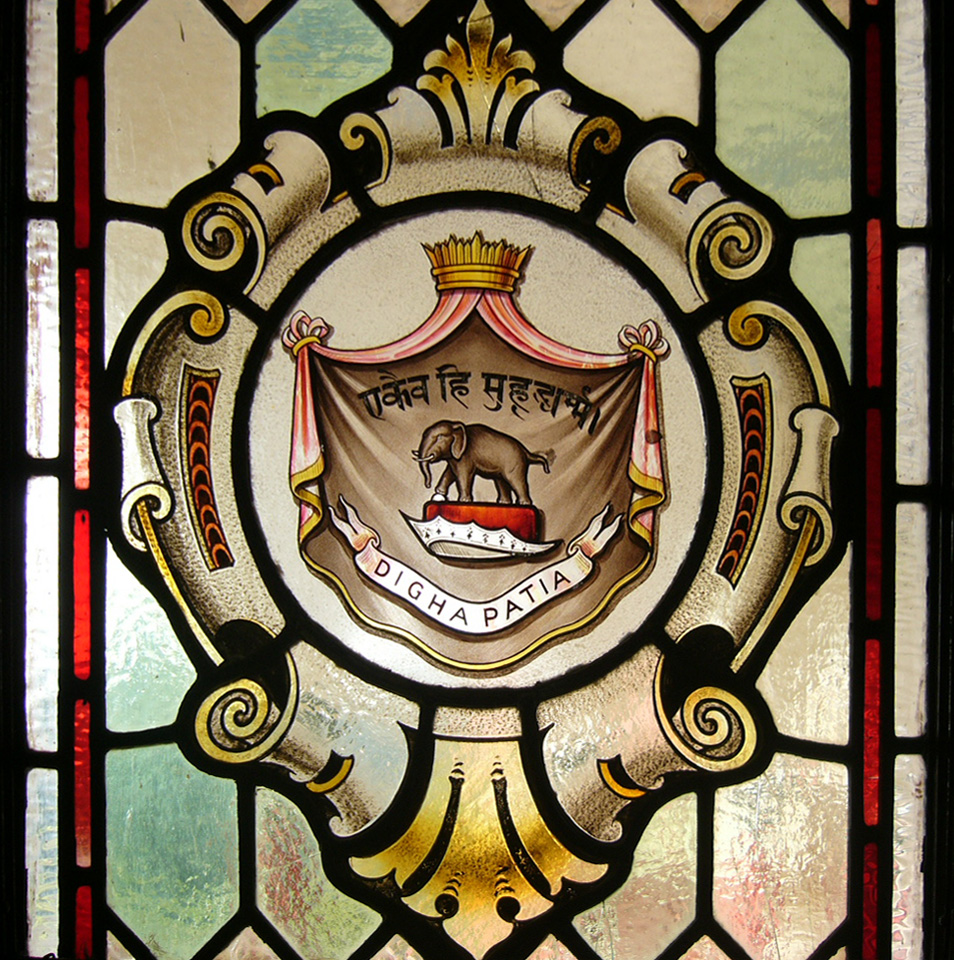
- Armorial of Dighapatia Raj
- Country: East Bengal
- Founded: 18th century
- Founder: Raja Dayaram Roy
- Current head: Legally Abolished (1950)
- Titles: Raja; Rai-Raiyan; Raja Bahadur

Dighapatia Raj (sometimes called Dighapatia Raj Paribar literally Dighapatia Royal Family) was a zamindari in present-day Rajshahi, which was ruled by this dynasty of 7 generations of Rajas from early 18th century till the mid-20th century; when the democratic government took power after the end of the British Monarchy's rule in India, in 1950, the East Pakistan government abolished aristocracies and the zamindari system in present-day Bangladesh. The family was seated at the Dighapatia Palace.

The family contributed largely to the development in education, infrastructure and culture of Rajshahi and North Bengal. They were especially famous for their generosity and public spirit. The Rajas built the Varendra Research Museum among other institutions of culture and education. The Rajas of Dighapatia were seated at the Dighapatia Palace. They received Maharaja title and Rai titles of honour from the Mughal Empire such as Raja, Maharaja and Raja Bahadur and other titles from the British Crown, such as the Indian Orders of Knighthood.

== Dighapatia Palace ==
Uttara Gano Bhaban, also known as The Maharaja's Palace or Dighapatia Palace (or Dighapatia Rajbari), is a historic, formerly royal palace in Natore, Bangladesh. It was built by the Raja of Dighapatia but is used as the official residence of the heads of states of Bangladesh in North Bengal. In the north, it serves as an official Presidential Palace. Originally used as the residence of the Rajas of Dighapatia, it is located about 2.40 km away from the Natore town. Raja Dayaram Roy constructed the main structure of the palace along with a few wings; but it was Raja Pramada Nath Roy rebuilt the whole palace complex after the catastrophic earthquake of 1897. The Dighapatia Palace was made 'Dighapatia Governor House' on 24 July 1967 by Abdul Monem Khan, the Governor of erstwhile East Pakistan. Later, after the country's independence, Bangabandhu Sheikh Mujibur Rahman, President of Bangladesh declared the Dighapatia Governor House as Uttara Gonobhaban on 9 February 1972. Before the split of Pakistan and Bangladesh, President Ayub Khan resided at the Palace. Various historic meetings took place at the palace, during the period of British rule in India, the era of East Pakistan, and finally after the independence of Bangladesh.

=== Gallery ===
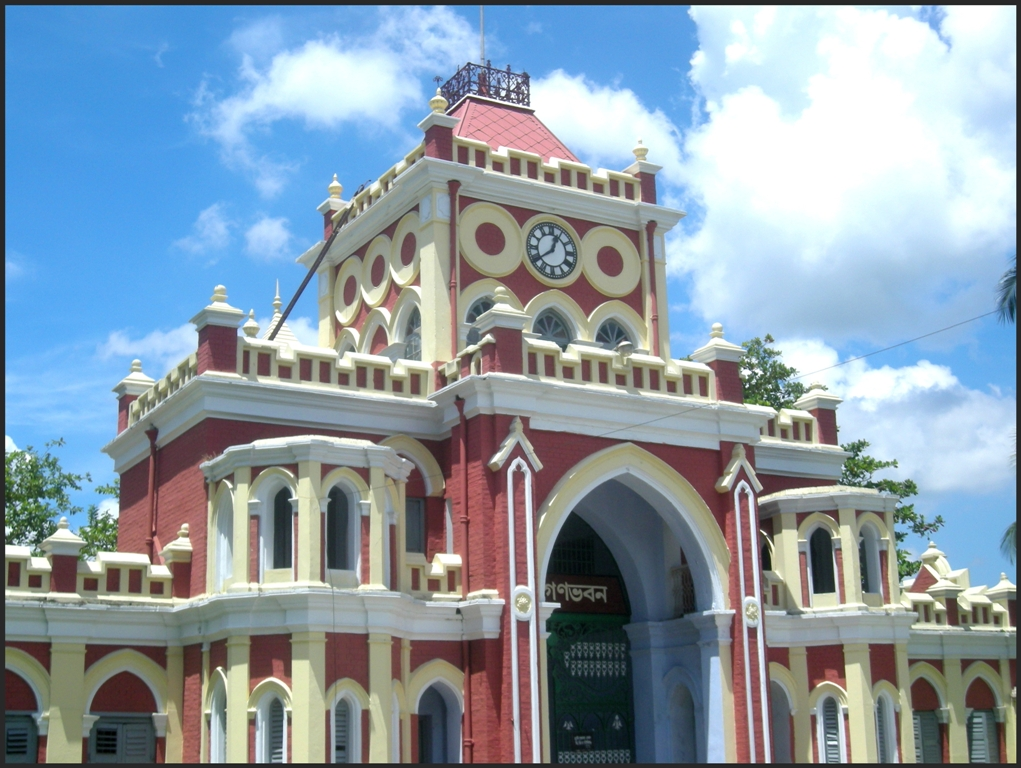
Front gate of Uttara Gano Bhaban

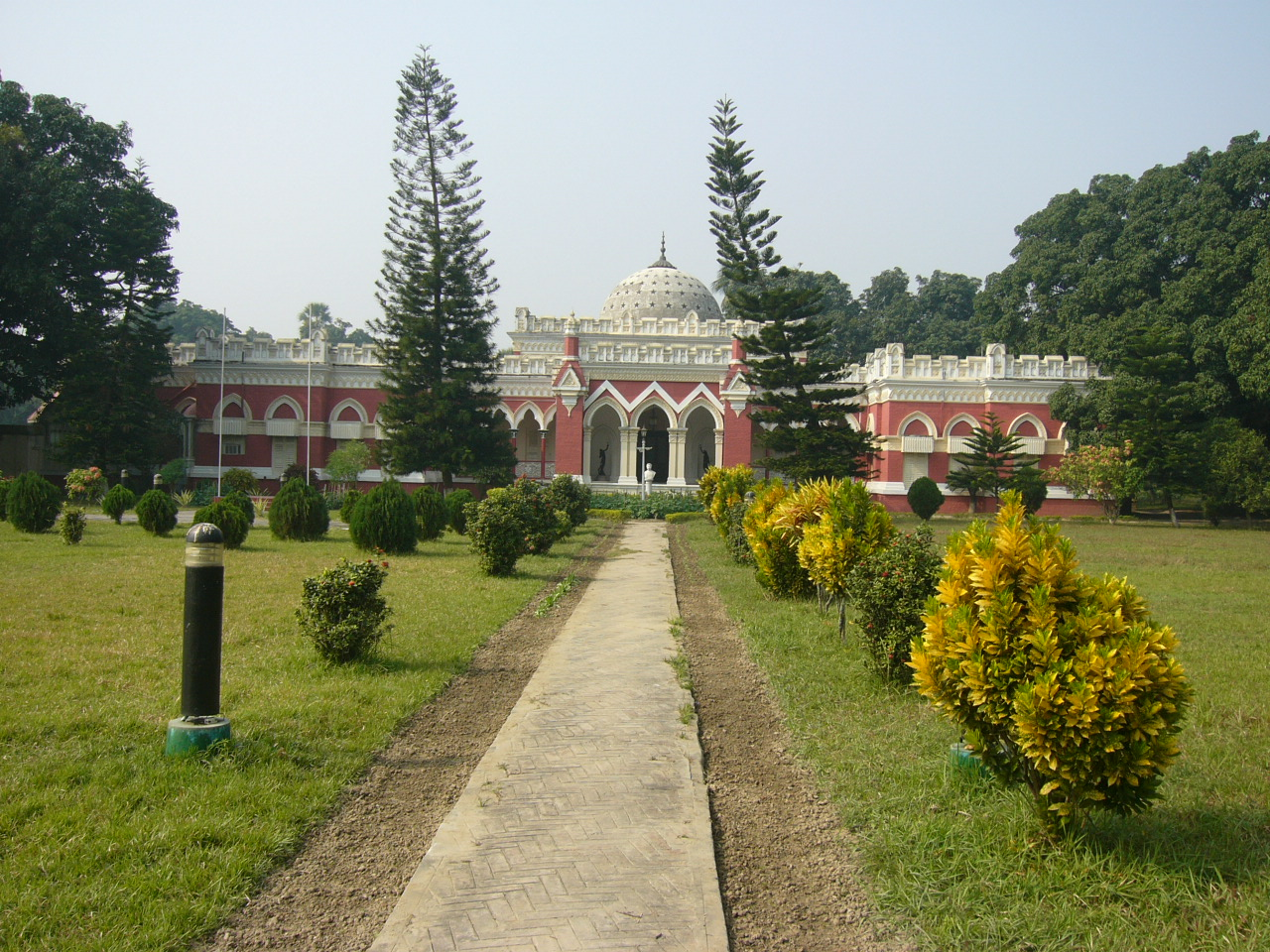
Uttara Gano Bhaban

== See also ==
- List of Palaces
- Natore Palace
