= Natore =

Natore নাটোর
- City and district headquarter
- Location within Bangladesh Rajshahi division Location within Bangladesh
- Coordinates: 24°24′48″N 88°58′59″E
- Country: Bangladesh
- Division: Rajshahi
- District: Natore
- Upazila: Natore Sadar
- Established: 1706 (320 years ago)
- Municipality: 1869 (157 years ago)

Government
  - Type: Mayor-Council
  - Body: Natore Municipality

Area
  - Total: 39.84 km^{2} (15.38 sq mi)

Population (2022)
  - Total: 147,000
  - Density: 3,690/km^{2} (9,560/sq mi)
- Demonym: Natoree
- Time zone: UTC+6 (BST)
- Postal Code: 6400
- Languages: Standard Bengali (Official)
- Police: Bangladesh Police
- Airport: Ishurdi Airport
- Website: www.natorepaurashava.org

Natore is a city in western Bangladesh. It is the headquarters of the Natore District. Its current administrator is Asma Shaheen. The Narod river is passing through the center of the city with pollution from upstream industrial developments flowing through.

== Demographics ==
Religions in Natore (2011)
Religion	Percent
Islam	82.35%
Hinduism	17.21%
Other or not stated	0.44%

According to the 2022 Bangladesh census, Natore city had a population of 87,067 and a literacy rate of 87.02%.

According to the 2011 Bangladesh census, Natore city had 18,828 households and a population of 81,203. 13,104 (16.14%) were under 10 years of age. Natore had a literacy rate (age 7 and over) of 75.06%, compared to the national average of 51.8%, and a sex ratio of 968 females per 1000 males.
