= Sarat Kumar Ray =

Indian prince and scholar

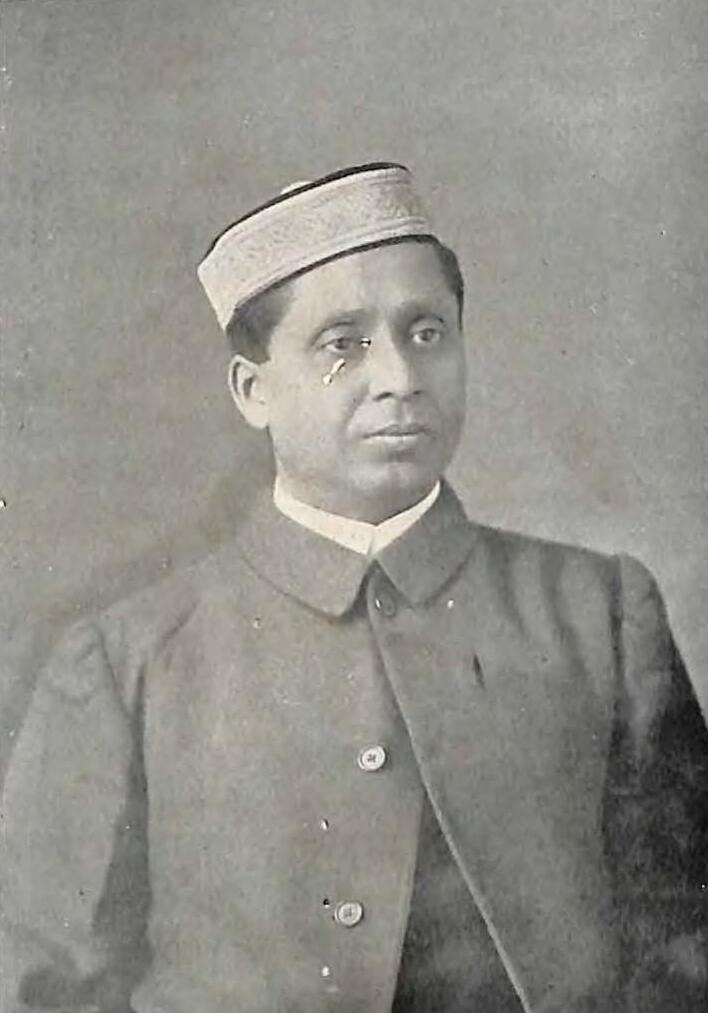
Sarat Kumar Roy (1876–1946)

Sarat Kumar Ray (Bengali: শরৎ কুমার রায়) (1876–1946) was a member of the royal family of Dighapatia. A noted scholar, he was the son of the Raja (King) Pramathanath Ray and lived in the Maharaja's Palace. Along with historian Ramaprasad Chanda, he co-founded the Varendra Research Museum, which Lord Dundas the Governor of Bengal, inaugurated in November 1919. He was well traveled, and visited England in 1900. He was a friend of Rabindranath Tagore.

== Early life ==
Ray was born in 1876 into the Dighapatia Raj family in Natore District, Bengal Presidency, British Raj. His father was Pramathanath Ray, the Zamindar of Dighapatia. He studied at Rajshahi Collegiate School and Ripon College (renamed Surendranath College). He earned a B.A. from Presidency College and a master's in physics from the University of Calcutta. He joined the Bangiya Sahitya Parishad after being introduced to it by his teacher Ramendra Sundar Tribedi. Through the Parishad he became acquainted with Dwijendranath Tagore and Rabindranath Tagore.

== Career ==
Ray published his book, Sivaji O Guru Gobinda Singha, in 1908, for which an introduction was written by Rabindranath Tagore.

Ray, along with Ramaprasad Chanda and Akshay Kumar Maitreya, worked to discover and preserve the archeological sites in the Varendra region of Bengal. They also worked with R. D. Banerji to explore different sites. On 27 September 1910, they founded the Varendra Research Society. Ray was the president of the society. They needed a museum to preserve the antiques they discovered. Ray donated 63 thousand rupees and his brother donated the land for the museum. The museum was inaugurated by Lord Dundas the Governor of Bengal, in November 1919.

Ray backed Ramaprasad Chanda in his anthropometric research work circa 1910.

Ray was a management member of Bangiya Sahitya Sammilani, Indian Music Society, Rajshahi Association, Rajshahi Public Library, and The Asiatic Society. He was elected to the Bengal Legislative Council in 1930.

== Death ==
Ray died on 12 April 1946.
