= Iqbal Matin's Gramophone Archive =

- ইকবাল মতিনের গ্রামোফোন আর্কাইভ
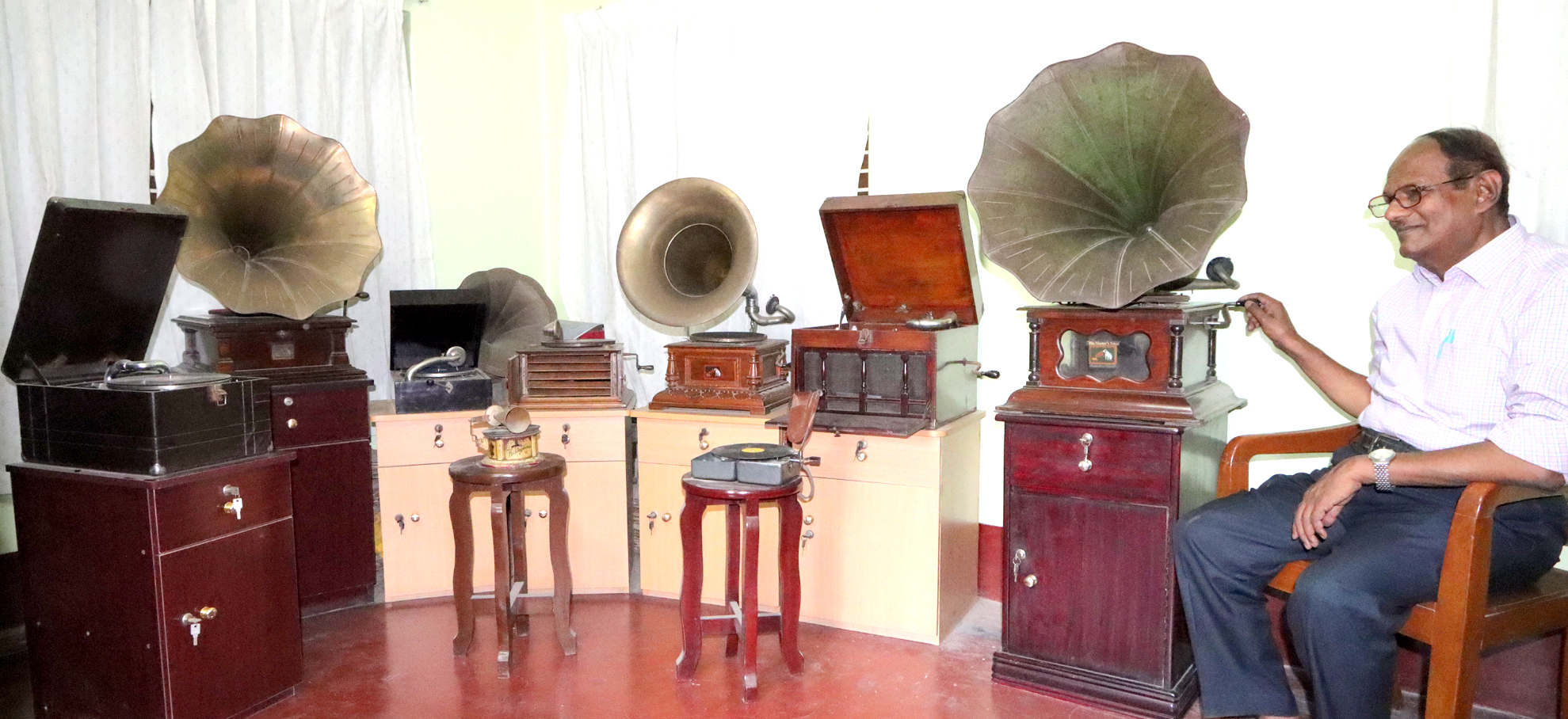
- Location: Rajshahi, Bangladesh
- Director: Iqbal Matin

The Iqbal Matin's Gramophone Archive houses more than 8,000 rare gramophone records, over 2,000 of which are more than a century old. The collection includes recordings produced by 78 record companies from various countries, including the United Kingdom, Germany, France, the United States, and British India. Most of these records date from 1902 to 1930, comprising a wide range of classical vocal and instrumental music, Bengali songs, dramas, and speeches. The archive also preserves nine antique gramophones, each over one hundred years old and still in working condition. It is located in Rajshahi, Bangladesh, and is considered one of the largest private gramophone record collections in the country.

== History ==
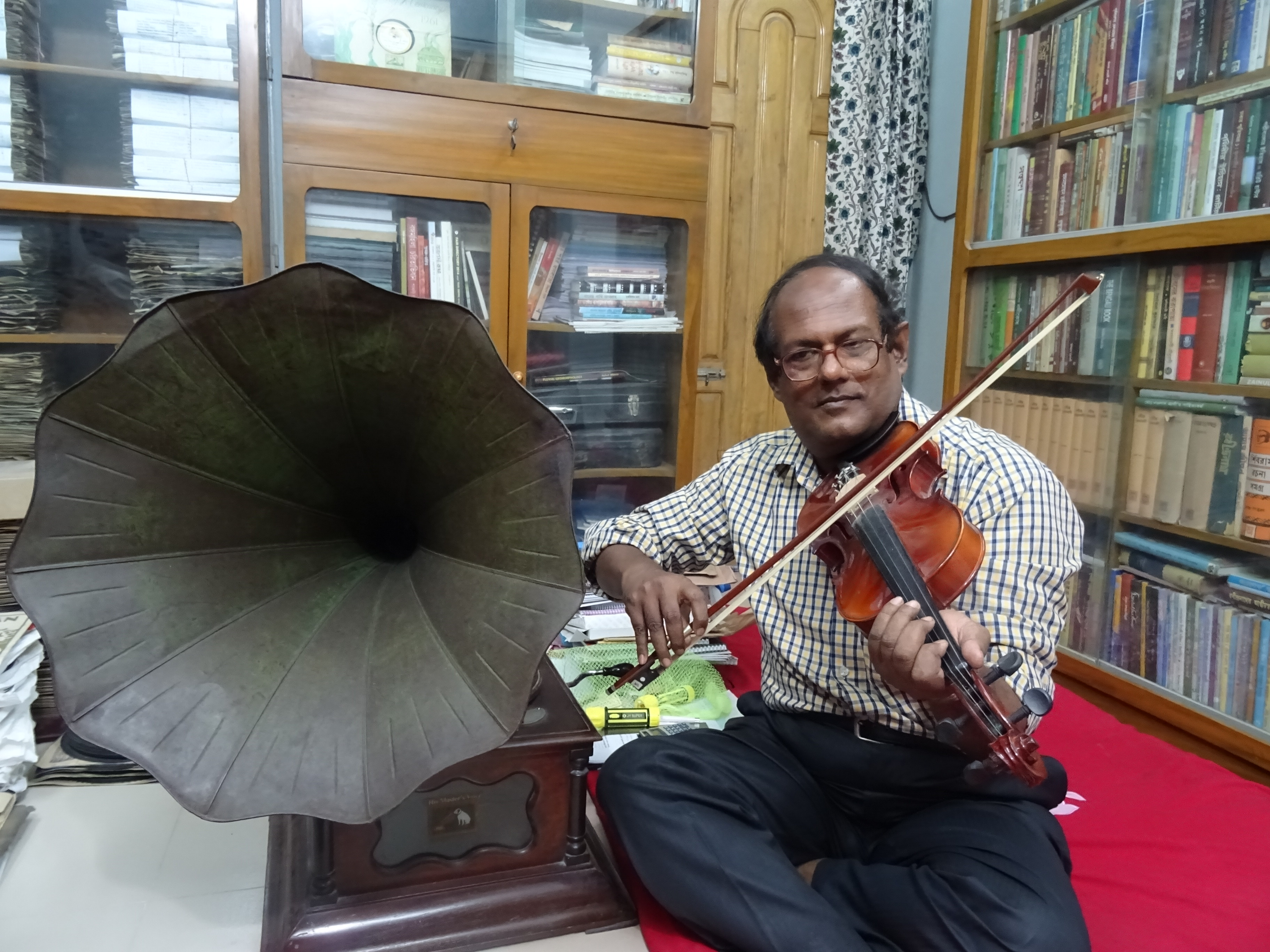
Iqbal Matin and his archive

The archive was established as a private initiative by Iqbal Matin, who is an engineer, university teacher, educationist, researcher, and musician. Alongside his academic career, he earned recognition as a violinist. From an early age, Matin developed a keen interest in music and began playing the violin. His engagement with violin study led him to read biographies of renowned maestros and musicians, through which he discovered many intriguing facts about their lives. This fascination with artists' lives eventually nurtured his passion for listening to and collecting musical materials. His enthusiasm for gramophone records deepened after reading Bhramyamaner Dinpanjika, a rare book by the eminent musicologist and composer Dilip Kumar Roy. At the age of thirteen, Matin received the book as a gift from Sarat Kumar Maitra, the zamindar of Kashimpur, Naogaon, who was impressed by his musical devotion. Inspired by this work, Matin began collecting rare gramophone records and historical materials related to music. Over the years, he has acquired records from Bangladesh, India, England, Germany, Australia, and other countries around the world.

== Iqbal Matin ==
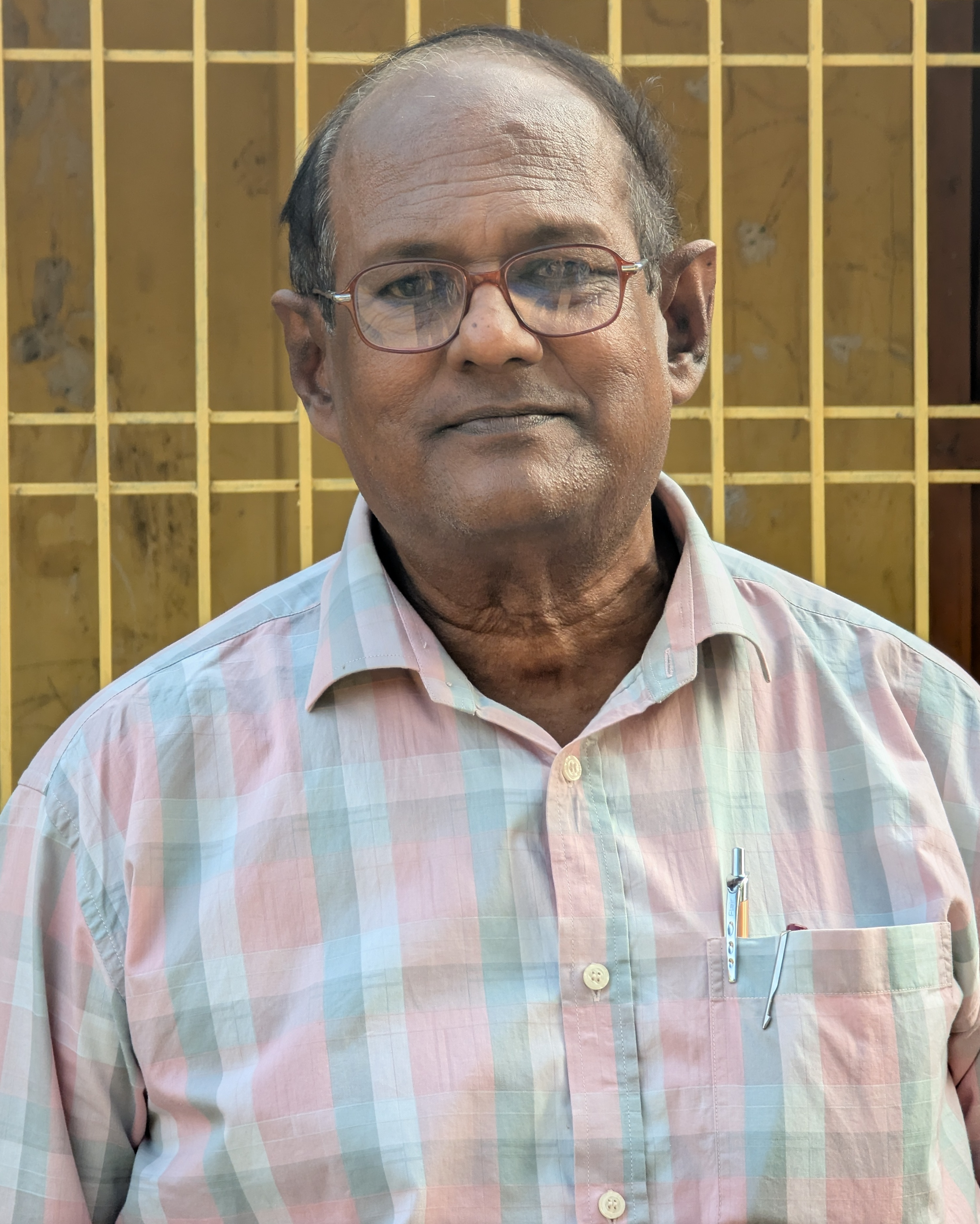
Iqbal Matin in 2025

Iqbal Matin was born in 1956. He completed his Secondary School Certificate (SSC) from Rajshahi Collegiate School in 1970, and his Higher Secondary Certificate (HSC) from Rajshahi College in 1972. He earned his bachelor's degree in civil engineering from the Rajshahi University of Engineering and Technology (RUET) in 1979, followed by a master's degree in water resources engineering from the Bangladesh University of Engineering and Technology (BUET) in 1984. In 1979, Matin joined the Department of Civil Engineering at RUET as a lecturer and continued teaching there until his retirement in 2022. He achieved distinction in the field of water resources research. In 1990, he was appointed as a member of the editorial board of the International Journal of Landscape and Ecological Studies, a position he still holds. Since 2004, he has also served as the Southeast Asia editorial representative for the International Association for Computer Methods and Advances in Geomechanics (IACMAG), a U.S.-based professional organization.

== Notable collections ==
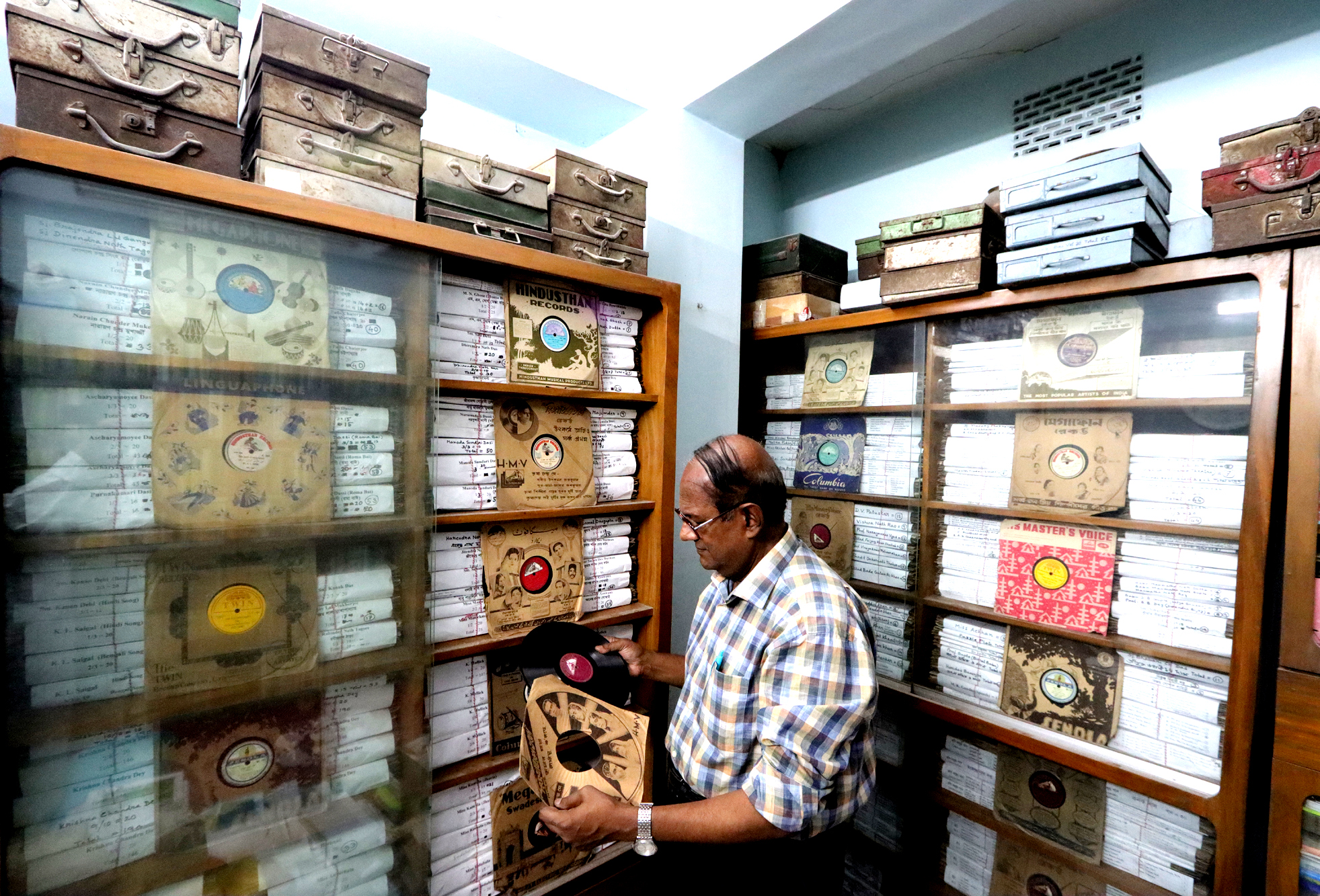
Antique Gramophone Collection

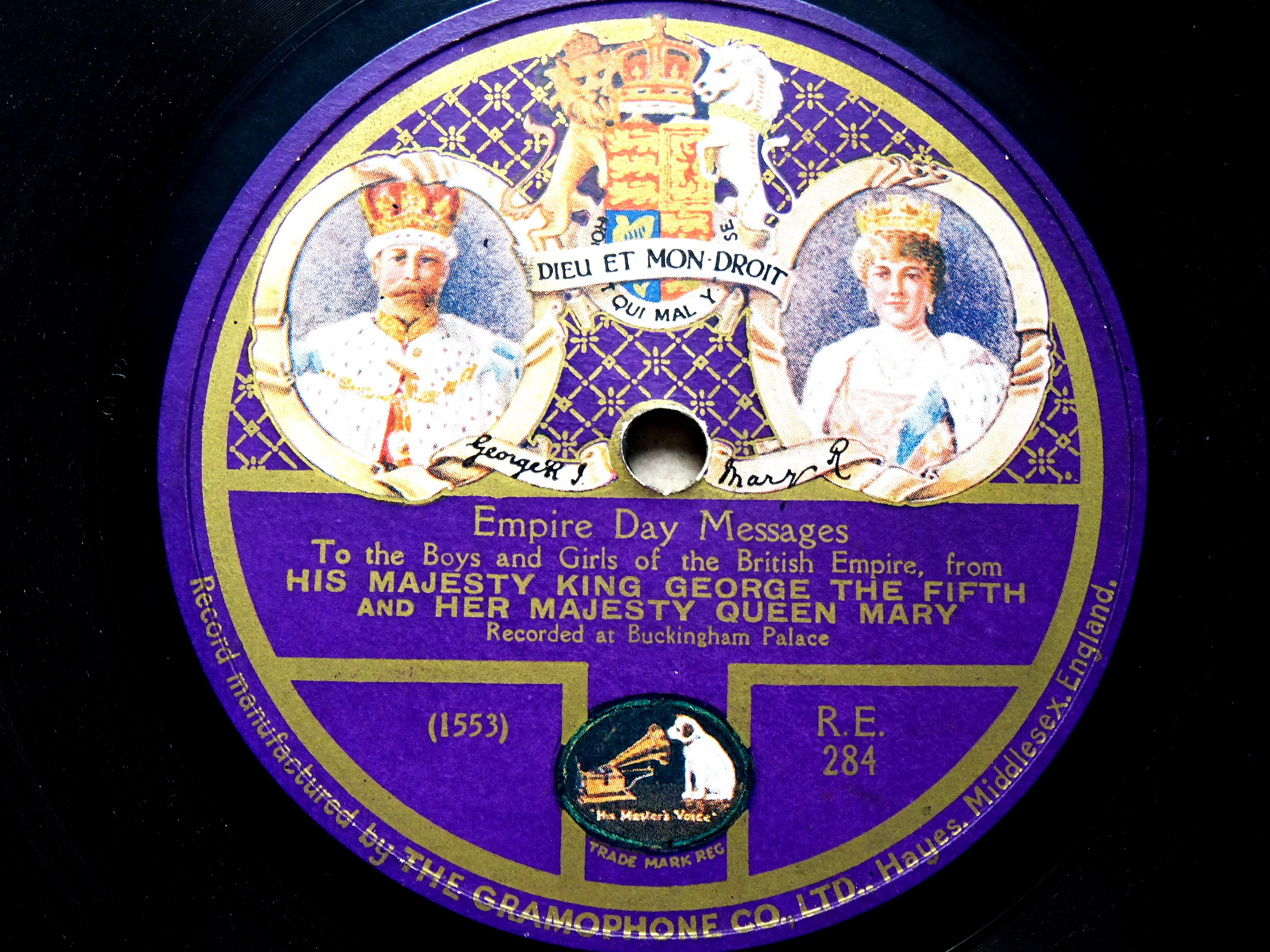
King George V and Queen Mary Speech, 1925

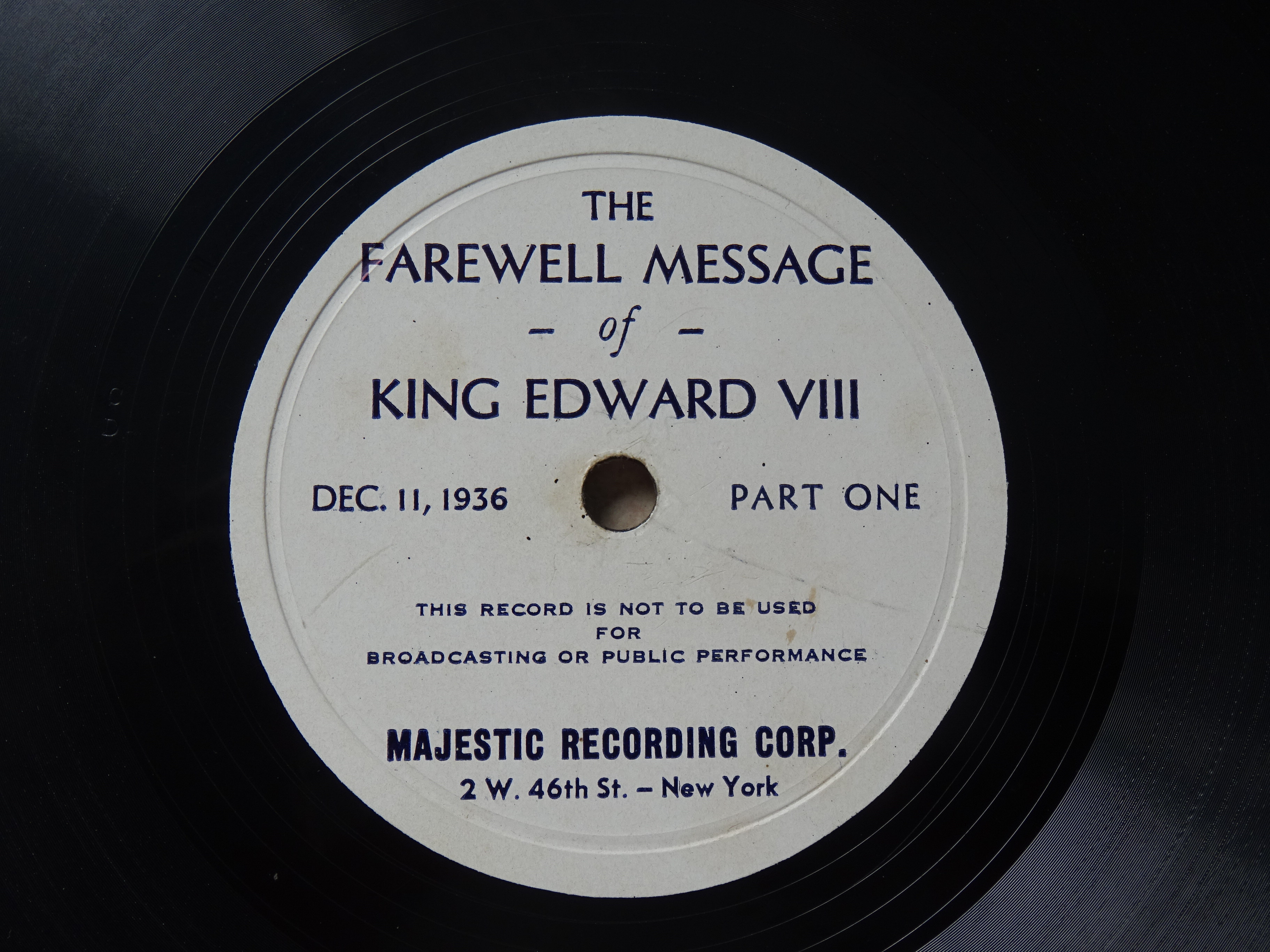
King Edward VIII Very Rare Record, 11 Dec, 1936

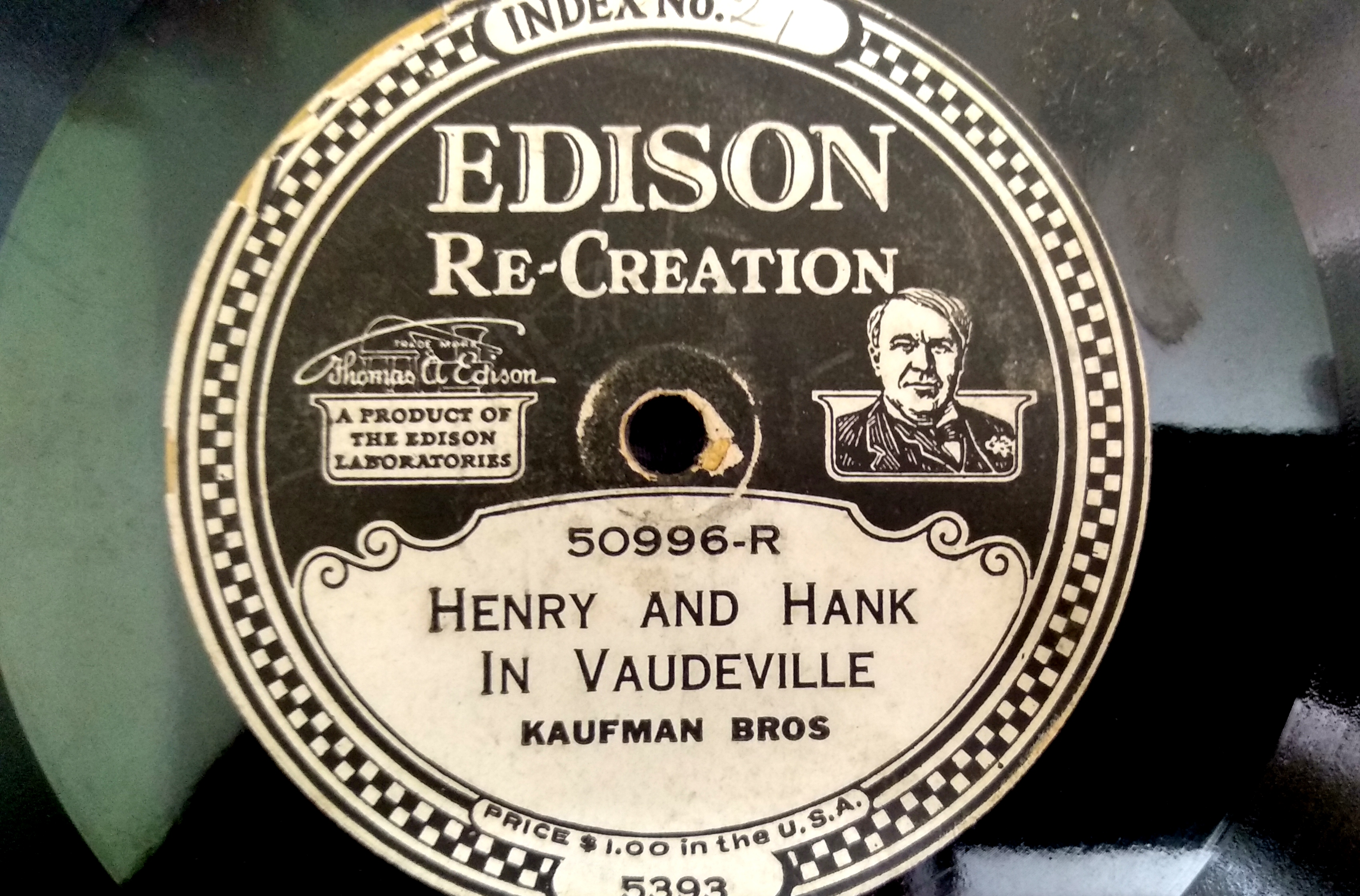
Inventor Edison's Company Record

The first gramophone record in British India, produced in 1902, is part of Matin's archive. His collection spans recordings from the early years of the Indian subcontinent's recording industry up to the 1930s, representing 78 record companies. Most records measure 10 inches in diameter, the standard size of the era, although the archive also includes records of 16, 12, 11, 9, 8, 7, 4, and 3 inches. Additionally, the collection features extremely rare pitchboard, aluminium, and plastic records, which hold significant value for music historians.

During the early decades of recording, a master copy or sample disc of each song was sent to the performer for approval before commercial release. Matin owns 119 such original master copies, considered exceptionally rare.

His collection also includes recordings by Allauddin Khan, his mentor Uzir Khan (a descendant of Tansen), and 1909 recordings of Dwijendralal Ray, Rajanikanta Sen, Atulprasad Sen, Rabindranath Tagore, and Kazi Nazrul Islam, all in their own voices. Beyond music, the archive preserves historical recordings of King George V, Queen Mary, Lord Mountbatten, Edward VIII, Sarojini Naidu, Mahatma Gandhi, and Subhas Chandra Bose.

Matin has collected these records through extensive research expeditions across Bangladesh and India, visiting zamindar estates, historical sites, and archives. Over the years, his dedication has helped preserve a valuable chapter of South Asian musical heritage.
