= Varendra Research Society =

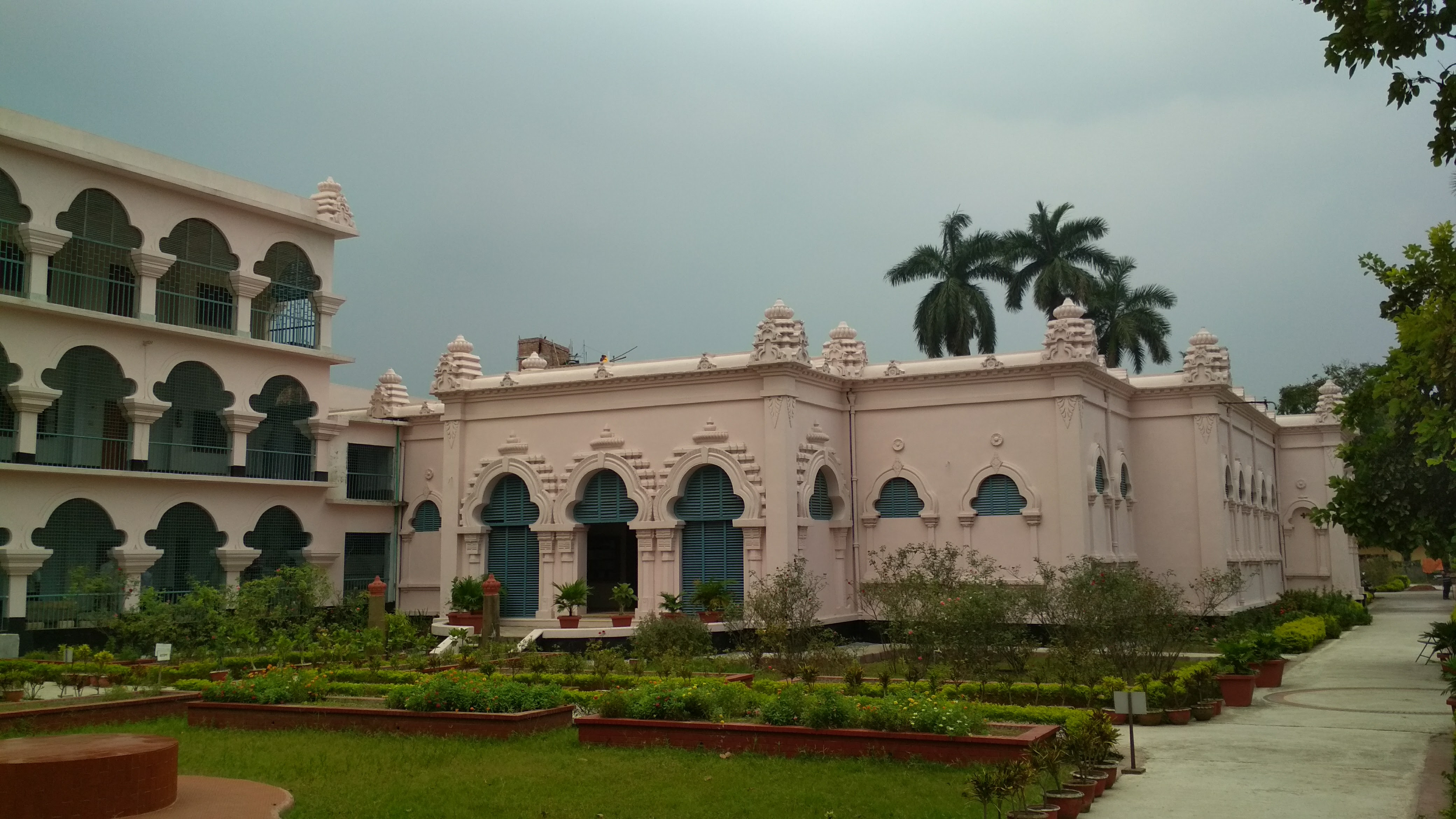
- Varendra research society, Rajshahi
- Formation: 1910
- Type: NGO
- Purpose: Promotion of studies and research into the History of Bengal
- Headquarters: Rajshahi, Bangladesh
- Region served: Bengal; Bangladesh; West Bengal, India

Varendra Research Society (1910–1963) was established in Rajshahi in 1910 for the promotion of studies and research into the History of Bengal in general, and in particular of the Varendra area

== History ==
Some of the leading and enlightened citizens of Rajshahi felt the necessity and justification of establishing such an institution that would explore the precious past of this region. Henceforth, The Varendra Research Society was established in 1910, and the founder of the Society Kumar Sarat Kumar Ray, the scion of Dighapatiya Royal family accompanied by Aksaya Kumar Maitreya, a leading lawyer and renowned historian; Ramaprasad Chanda, a reputed scholar in history, art and archeology

== Organization ==
=== Founding directors ===
- Kumar Sarat Kumar Ray
- Aksaya Kumar Maitreya
- Rakhaldas Bandyopadhyay

== Major contributions ==
=== Organization ===
The Varendra Research Museum was founded with a standing tribute to the princely generosity of Kumar Sarat Kumar Ray as a president; the great scholarship of Aksaya Kumar Maitreya as a Director; Ramaprasad Chanda, as an honorary Secretary.

=== Publications ===
The society published...

- Journal of the Varendra Research Society
- twelve Annual Reports and 9 Monographs containing 31 articles, two works on inscriptions, one on ethnology, one on dynastic history,
- a catalogue of the archaeological relics in the museum,
- a list of inscriptions, and
- several carefully edited Sanskrit texts.

=== Archaeological excavations ===
- Excavated the Pradyumneshvar Tank at Deopara in Rajshahi district and recovered from its bed as many as 64 pieces of sculpture and three terracotta Manasa-ghatas.
- Excavated a high mound at Cossipur, 5 miles from Balurghat in West Dinajpur and uncovered brick built walls, a brick built road approaching the mound and a number of sculptures.
- Excavated the sites at Mahisantosh and Kumarpur in Rajshahi district and collected a number of antiquities.
- Excavations at Paharpur were undertaken by the Society in collaboration with the University of Calcutta.
