= Abdur Rahman Khan (disambiguation) =

Abdur Rahman Khan (1840s–1901) was an Emir of Afghanistan.

Abdur Rahman Khan or Abdul Rahman Khan may also refer to:

- Abdur Rahman Khan (politician) (fl. 1950s), East Pakistan politician
- Abdul Rahman Khan (Azad Kashmiri politician) (fl. 1969–1985), Azad Kashmiri politician
- Abdur Rahman Khan (educator) (1878–1939), Bengali academic and education service officer
- Abdur Rahman Khan (writer) (1890–1964), Pakistani Bengali educator and writer
- Abdul Rahman Khan Yousuf Khan (1925–2007), Indian politician
- Abdul Rehman Khan (born 1952), Pakistani politician
- Md Abdur Rahman Khan, Bangladeshi civil servant
- Nawab Abdur Rahman Khan, the last ruler (Nawab) of the Jhajjar estate

== See also ==
- Abd al-Rahman
