= Chanda (surname) =

Origin
- Origin: Bengali Hindu
- Region of origin: Bengal

Chanda (Bengali: চন্দ) (pronounced [t͡ʃɔndɔ]) is primarily a native Bengali surname that is found among the Bengali Kayasthas, Barujibis, Baishya Kapalis and some other Bengali castes in the Indian states of West Bengal, Assam and Tripura as well as in Bangladesh.

== Origin ==
The origin of this surname was a Sanskrit word čandra which means ‘pleasant shining; moon’.

== Notable people with the surname ==
- Arnab Chanda, English writer, producer, and actor
- Arun Kumar Chanda (1899–1947), Indian independence activist
- Anil Kumar Chanda, Indian politician
- Barun Chanda, Indian actor and author
- Naomi Chanda, Zambian farmer and agriculture trainer
- Narayan Chandra Chanda, Bangladeshi politician
- Nayan Chanda (born 1946), Indian journalist
- Raja Chanda, Indian film director
- Ramaprasad Chanda (1873–1942), Indian historian and archaeologist
- Rani Chanda, Indian artist and writer
- Rishi Chanda, Indian music director, composer and singer
- Samir Chanda (1957–2011), Indian art director and production designer
- Sandipan Chanda (born 1983), Indian chess player
