= Rajshahi College =

Third oldest college in Bangladesh

- রাজশাহী কলেজ
- Rajshahi College Logo
- Type: Government College
- Established: 1873; 153 years ago
- Founder: King Haranath Roy Chowdhury
- Academic affiliations: National University, Bangladesh
- Principal: Professor Dr. Md. Ibrahim Ali
- Vice Principal: Professor Abu Md. Younus Ali
- Academic staff: 241
- Administrative staff: 111
- Students: 26000 (approx)
- Location: Rajshahi, Rajshahi, 6100, Bangladesh; 24.3645°N 88.5958°E
- Campus: 14 hectares (35 acres); Urban
- EIIN: 126490
- College code: National University - 2501; Board of Intermediate and Secondary Education, Rajshahi – 1000
- Colors
- Website: rc.gov.bd

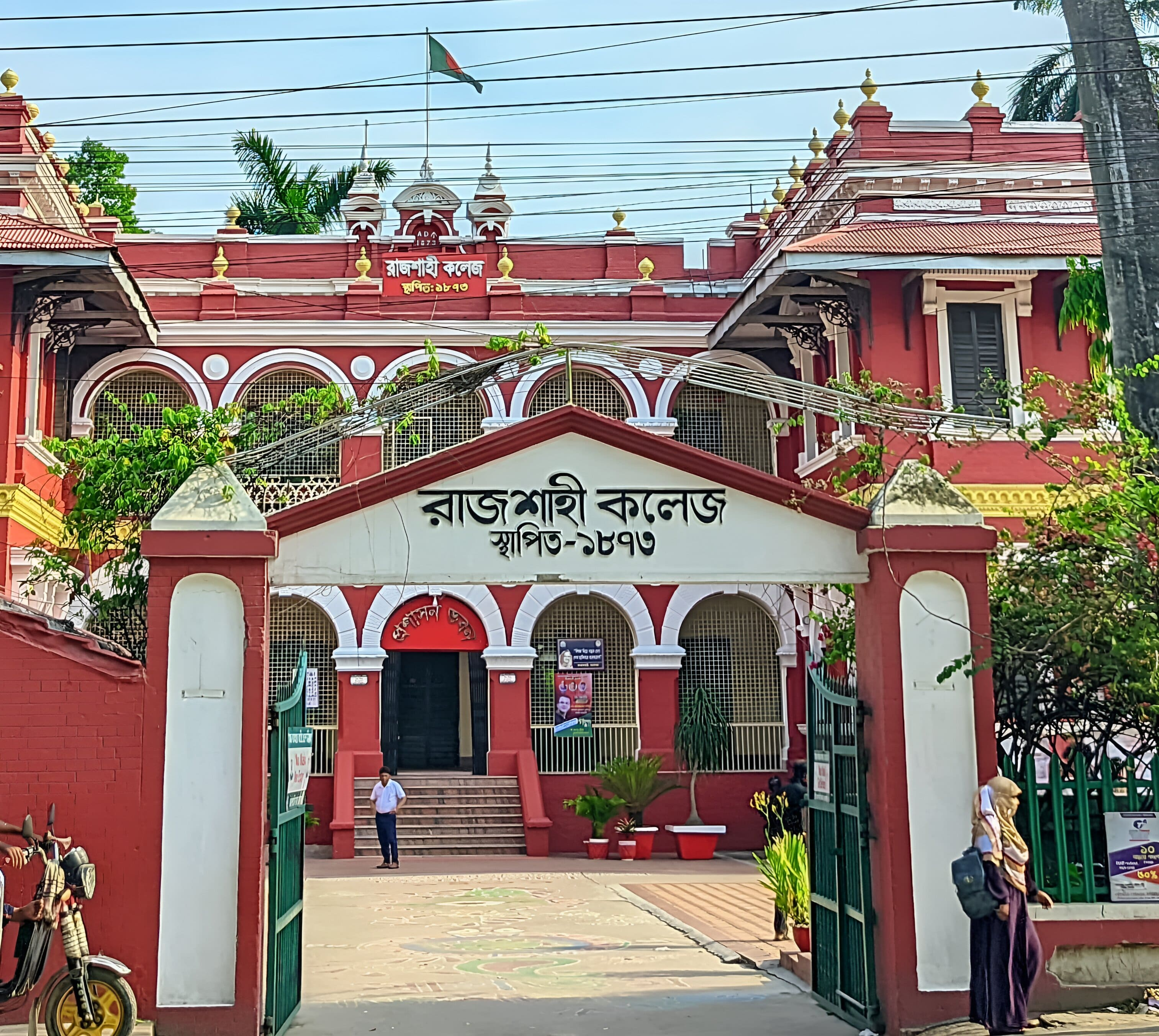
Main gate of Rajshahi College

Rajshahi College (Bengali: রাজশাহী কলেজ) is a public educational institution in Rajshahi, Bangladesh. Established in 1873, it is the third oldest college in Bangladesh after Dhaka College and Chittagong College.

Affiliated with the National University of Bangladesh, Rajshahi College offers three years Degree pass course and four years honours degree courses in various disciplines. Since 1996, it had stopped enrolling higher secondary students. It resumed enrollment of higher secondary students in 2010. Situated in the city center, Rajshahi College is adjacent to Rajshahi Collegiate School and very close to the famous Varendra Museum.

== History ==
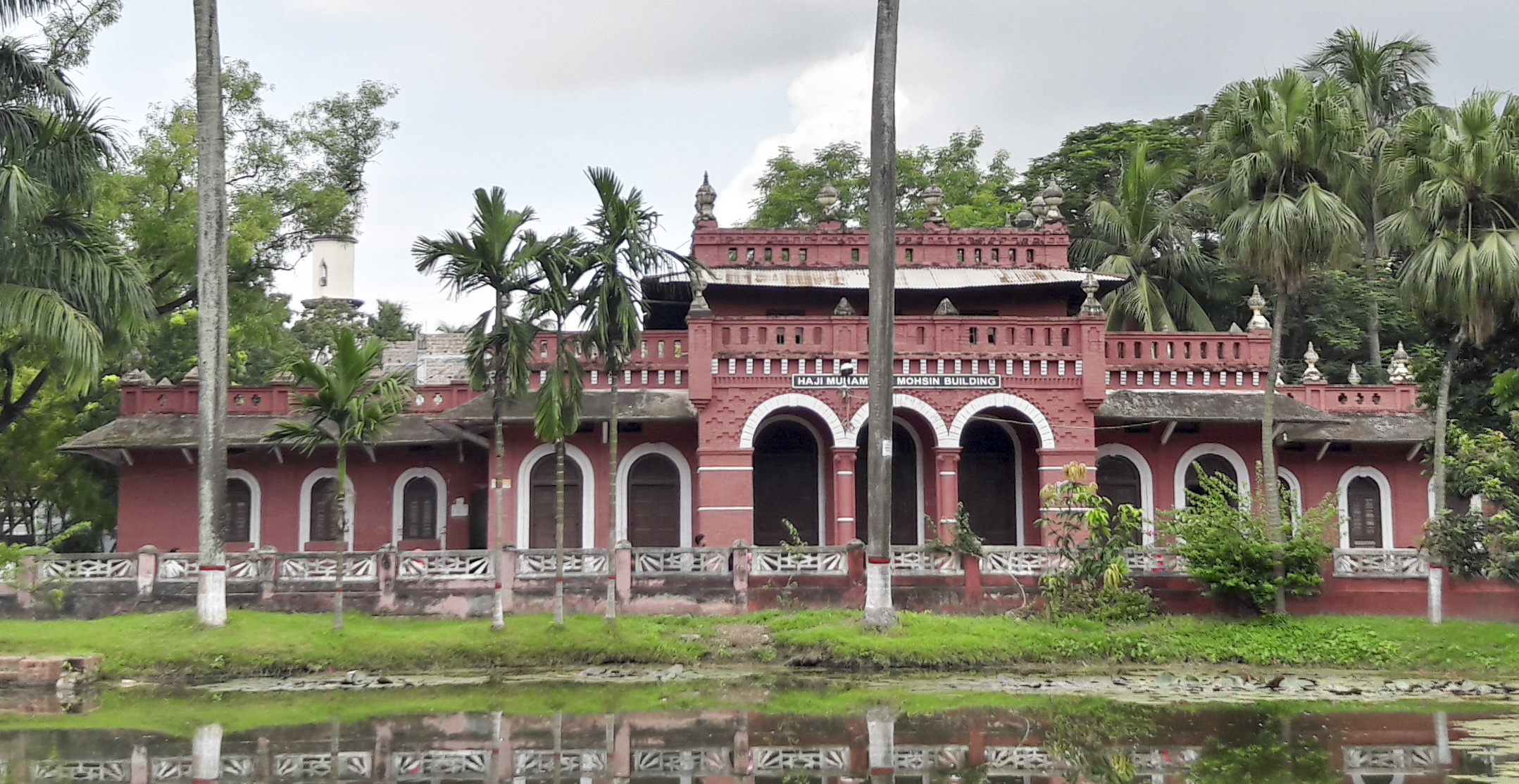
Hazi Mohammad Mohsin Bhaban, Est 1888

The origins of the college were in a private English school founded in Rajshahi in 1828 by the concerted efforts of many of the region's most prominent citizens (this school is now known as Rajshahi Collegiate School). In 1836 the school was taken over by the provincial government of Bengal and was converted into a Government Zilla (or District) School. In 1873, the Zilla School was upgraded as an intermediate college, and F.A. courses were introduced into its curriculum. With further development this college was accorded "first-grade rank" in 1878, which meant that it could teach B.A. courses and be affiliated to the University of Calcutta. The name "Rajshahi College" came with the first-grade rank in 1878. The year 1881 saw the inauguration of M. A. classes; B.L. classes were added in 1883. The postgraduate Departments in Arts and in Law continued till 1909 when they were withdrawn because the college could not meet the requirements of the new regulations of the University of Calcutta which came into force that year.

Starting with only 6 students on the roll in 1873, the college counted 100 in 1878, 200 in 1900, 400 in 1910, 800 in 1920 and no less than 1000 in 1924; there was only one Muslim student at the college in 1873; 5 years later it was still one, but the figure rose to 156 in 1916 and climaxed at 215 in 1924. Khan Bahadur Chayan Uddin Ahmed (B.A. English) was the first Muslim graduate of East Bengal from Rajshahi college. Subsequently, of course, Muslim numbers rose in the college and after 1947 eventually exceeded the Hindu numbers. Today, in independent Bangladesh, the college has been accorded "University College" status and no longer teaches Higher Secondary or Intermediate courses. Currently, it is part of the University of Rajshahi system of Bangladesh and its curriculum includes only undergraduate and post-graduate courses in a variety of disciplines.

== Buildings ==
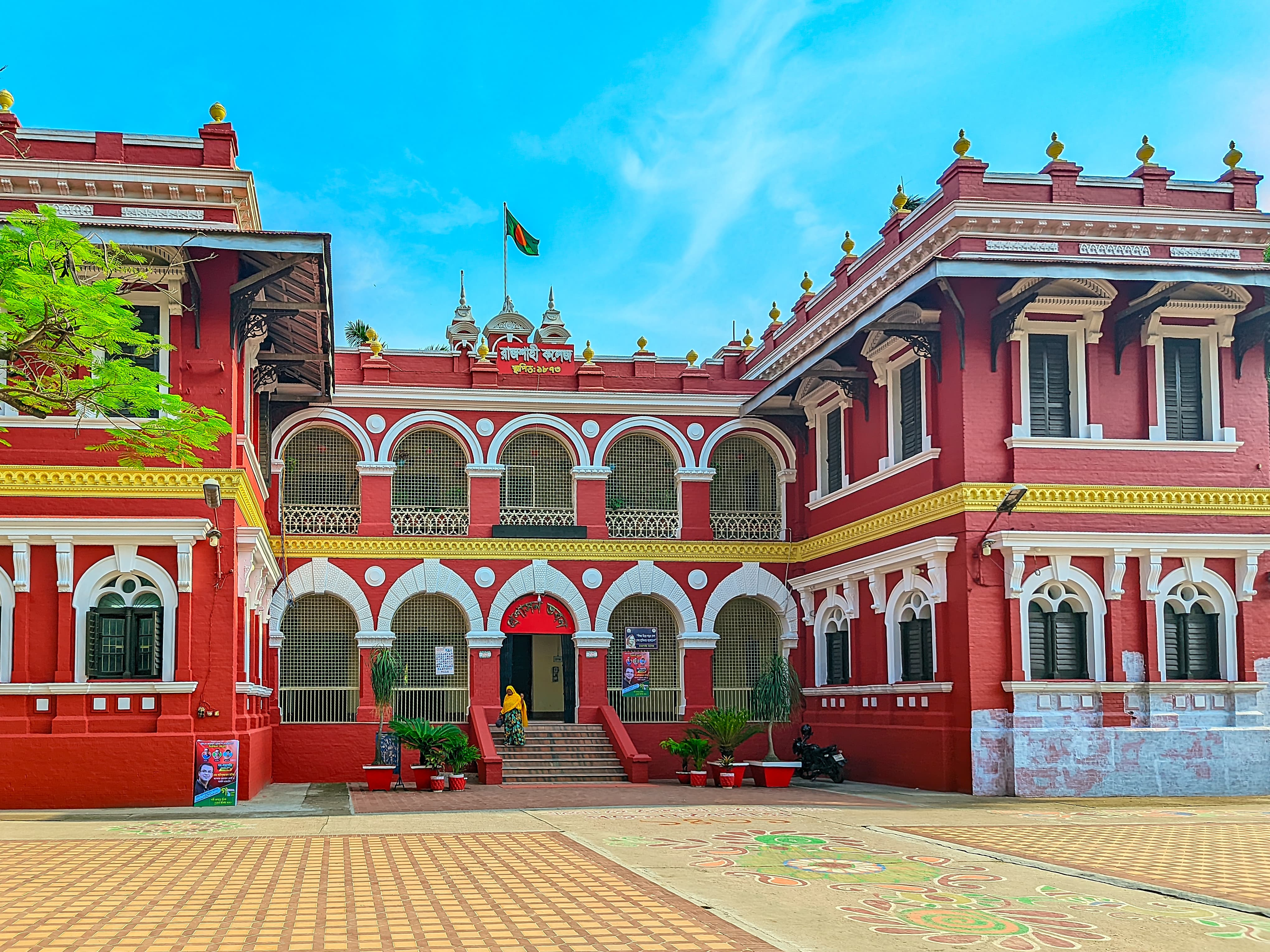
Administrative building

The main administrative building of Rajshahi College is a good example of British Indian colonial architecture. Other important older buildings of the colonial period include the Fuller Hostel Biology Building, Chemistry Building, Physics Building, former Muslim Hostel etc. Newer buildings include the Library and Auditorium, an Arts building, both dating from the 1950s and a new Science building, dating from the 1990s.

== Rajshahi College and the Language Movement ==
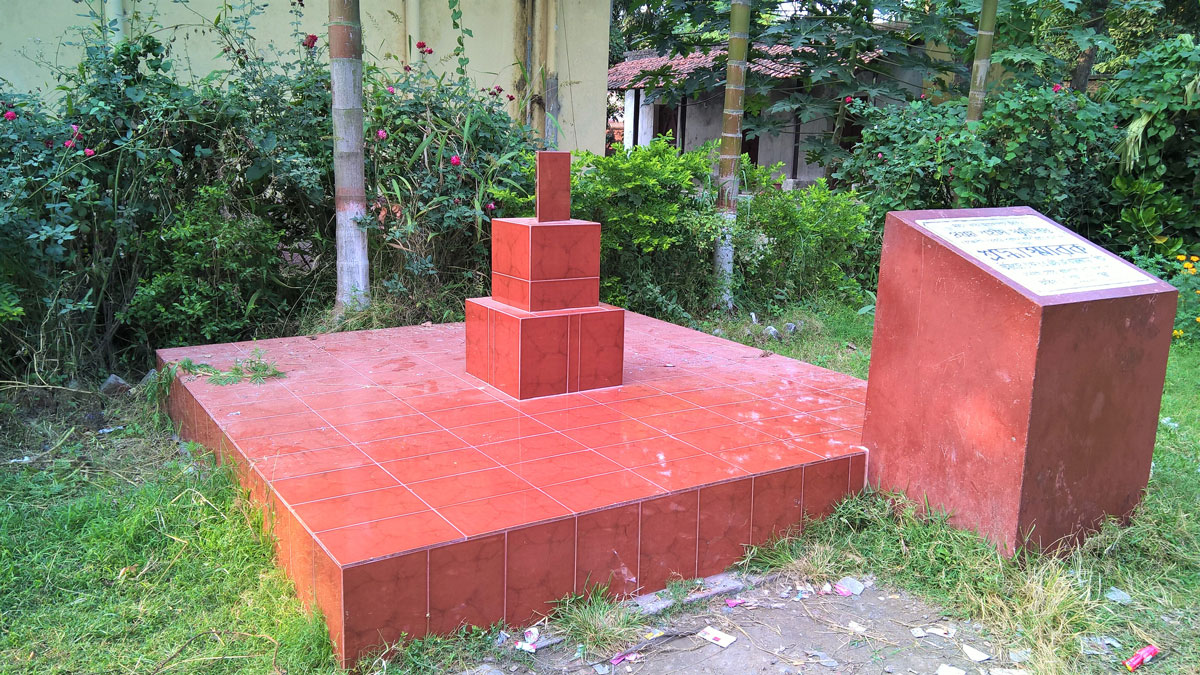
First martyr monument dedicated to the Language Movement in 1952.

Immediately after the killing of students in Dhaka on 21 February 1952 students in Rajshahi College built what is often thought to be the first (but short lived) martyr monument dedicated to the Language Movement. The present monument to the Language Movement dates from 1973. It was built to replace an earlier monument, built in 1969, that was destroyed by Pakistani forces in 1971.

== E-Service ==
E-Service plays an important role to bring momentum, transparency and accountability in government service. To achieve the goals of A-2I Programme of Digital Bangladesh, Rajshahi College has taken some initiatives.

There are about 30,000 students pursuing education at HSC, Pass, Honors and Masters levels at Rajshahi College. About 250 teachers are engaged in teaching them and more than 150 other employees support the administration, accounts and all sorts of activities in this college. Frequent change in Principals and weakness in record keeping created serious difficulties in preserving records of essential documents and information of students. Moreover, it is much difficult and a tedious task for the administration to maintain and ensure good governance of the college.

In February 2012, Rajshahi College launched an Information and Communication Technology (ICT) program to modernize its administrative operations. Through this initiative, the college established a centralized digital database to manage student records, faculty information, financial accounts and general institutional data. As an early adopter of digital infrastructure among government colleges in Bangladesh, the institution transitioned many of its administrative workflows to online systems.

== Notable alumni and faculty ==
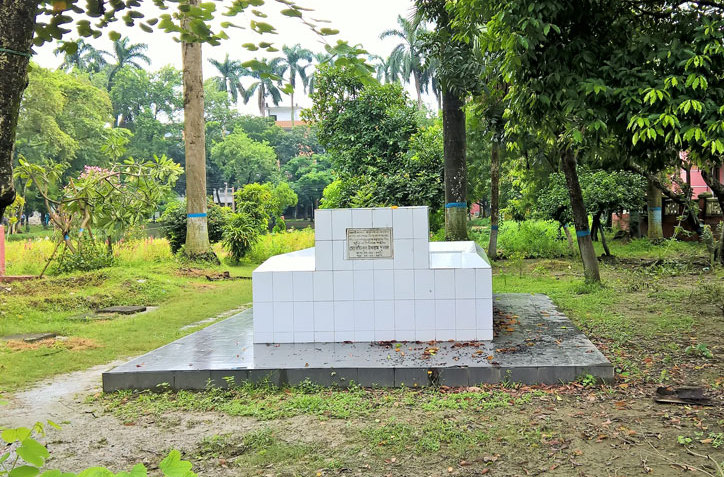
Grave of Shaheed Dulal at Rajshahi College

Highly distinguished alumni and faculty of Rajshahi College include:

- Akshay Kumar Maitreya, historian
- Jadunath Sarkar, historian
- Abdur Rahman Khan, Divisional Inspector School
- Radhabinod Pal, jurist
- Ashrafuddin Ahmad Chowdhury, political worker and freedom fighter
- Swami Tejasananda, founding principal of Ramakrishna Mission Vidyamandira
- Qazi Motahar Hossain, statistician, chess player, essayist and academic
- Harendranath Munshi, Indian freedom fighter
- Pramathanath Bishi, author and academic
- Enamul Haque, professor from 1948 to 1952
- Rajib Humayun, linguist, playwright, academic
- Maqbular Rahman Sarkar, academic
- Mokbula Manzoor, author and novelist
- Khademul Bashar, 3rd Chief of Air Staff of Bangladesh Air Force
- Hasan Azizul Huq, novelist
- Loqman Husain, first Secretary of the Ministry of Posts, Telegraphs and Telephones of Bangladesh and inaugural Executive Director of the Asia-Pacific Telecommunity
- Idris Ahmed Mia, politician
- Prabhas Chandra Lahiri, politician

== Former principals ==
SL	Principal's name	Working period start	Working period end
1	Mr. Hargobind Sen (Head Master of Rajshahi Zilla School)	1873	1878
2	Mr. Frederick Townley Dowding	1878	1880
3	Mr. A. C. Edward	1880	1887
4	Mr. W. B. Livingstone	1887	
5	Mr. G. W.R. Taper	1887	
6	Mr. W. B. Livingstone	1887	1897
7	Mr. Rai Kumudini Kanta Banerjee Bahadur	1897	1919
8	P. Niogi	1919	
9	Mr. Rai Kumudini Kanta Banerjee Bahadur	1920	1924
10	Mr. Krishna Chandra Bhattacharya	1924	
11	Mr. S. N. Maitra	1925	1926
12	Mr. T. T. Williums	1926	1927
13	Mr. Aswini Kumar Mukerji	1927	1928
14	Mr. T. T. Williums	1928	1930
15	Mr. B. M. Sen	1930	1931
16	Mr. Rai Hem Chandra Dey Bahadur	1931	1932
17	W. A. Jenkins	1932	1933
18	Mr. Harilal Choudhury	1933	
19	P. D. Shastri	1933	1935
20	Mr. J. M. Bose	1935	1940
21	S. K. Banarjee	1940	
22	Snehamoy Datta	1941	1945
23	Mamtaz Uddin Ahmed	1945	1950
24	I. H. Juberi	1950	1951
25	Mr. M. Taher Jamil	1951	
26	Mr. A. Karim Mondal	1951	
27	Mr. A. Munyem	1951	1952
28	Mr. Solomon Choudhury	1952	1954
29	Md. Shams-Ul-Haque	1954	1956
30	Abdul Haque	1956	1959
31	Shamsuzzaman Choudhury	1959	1961
32	M. A. Haye	1961	1969
33	Elias Ahmed	1969	1970
34	M. Shamsuddin Miah	1970	1972
35	Nurur Rahman Khan	14/06/1972	13/09/1976
36	M. Noimuddin	14/09/1976	24/09/1979
37	Lutfar Rahman	26/09/1979	8/1/1981
38	S. M. Abdur Rahman	8/1/1981	25/12/1983
39	Md. Tamijul Haque	25/12/1983	29/05/1984
40	Md. Abul Quasem	28/07/1984	17/08/1990
41	Md. Shamsur Rahman	30/08/1990	9/12/1992
42	Serajul Islam	25/12/1992	2/2/1993
43	Shams Uddin Ahmad	13/02/1993	16/03/1995
44	A. S. M. Moarraf	19/03/1995	12/2/1996
45	Golam Rabbani	4/4/1996	28/11/1996
46	Sher Mohammad	17/09/1997	17/09/1997
47	Prof Md. Eunus Ali Dewan	29/09/1997	28/06/1998
48	Akhtar Banu	28/06/1998	2/10/1999
49	Md. Abdul Haye Choudhury	4/10/1999	23/12/1999
50	Arun Kumar Bhattacharya	13/04/2000	2/10/2000
51	K. M. Jalal Uddin Akber	14/10/2000	6/4/2002
52	Abdul Bashir	14/08/2002	29/03/2004
53	Md. Ashraful Islam	4/4/2004	26/06/2005
54	Md. Shams Ul Haque	27/07/2005	18/06/2008
55	Ali Reza Md. Abdul Mazid	17/07/2008	15/04/2014
56	Md. Habibur Rahman	14/08/2014	3/02/2021
57	Md. Abdul Khaleque	4/10/2021	Continuing
Source: "Former Principals". Rajshahi College.

== Former vice principals ==
SL	Vice principal's name	Working period start	Working period end
1	Mr. Aswini Kumar Mukerji	1926	1928
2	Mr. H. L. Choudhury	1934	
3	Mr. Md. Abu Hena	1942	
4	Subodh Chandra Sen Gupta	1943	
5	Mr. Mahammad Taher Jamil	1948	
6	Moulvi Maqbul Ahamed	1952	
7	Mr. M. Ahmed Hossain	1957	
8	Mr. M. A. Haye	1959	1960
9	Mohammad Shamsuddin Miah	1963	1965
10	Syed Lutfal Haque	26/02/1966	23/04/1967
11	Mr. M. Ramjan	1969	
12	Mr. Md. Abdul Khaleque	1970	
13	Mr. Md. Abdul Gofur	1972	
14	Mr. S. M. Abdur Rahman	1973	
15	Belayet Ali	15/03/1974	7/5/1980
16	Md. Abdur Razzak	1980	1984
17	Md. Moslem Ali	12/4/1984	31/12/1986
18	Khandokar Md. Monirul Islam	1988	1989
19	A. B. M. Rezaul Haque	1990	
20	A. J. M. Rezaul Haque Choudhury	2/9/1990	29/11/1992
21	Md. Golam Akbar	30/11/1992	19/10/1999
22	Md. Khoda Bakhs Mridha	26/04/2000	6/8/2000
23	Md. Masum Ali	1/3/2001	24/04/2002
24	Abul Asad Mahmud	25/08/2002	30/07/2005
25	Md. Shafiq Uddin	30/07/2005	7/3/2007
25	S. M. Razaul Haque	21/04/2007	31/01/2008
26	Md. Abdul Wadud	8/4/2008	28/03/2009
27	Md. Habibur Rahman	5/7/2009	14/08/2014
28	Shish Mohammad	27/12/2014	30/12/2014
29	Al-Faruk Choudhury	1/1/2015	2020
30	Md. Abdul Khaleque	2020	03/10/2021
31	Md. Oliur Rahman	2021	Continuing
Source: "Former Vice Principals". Rajshahi College.
