= Rajshahi Public Library =

Research institute in Bangladesh

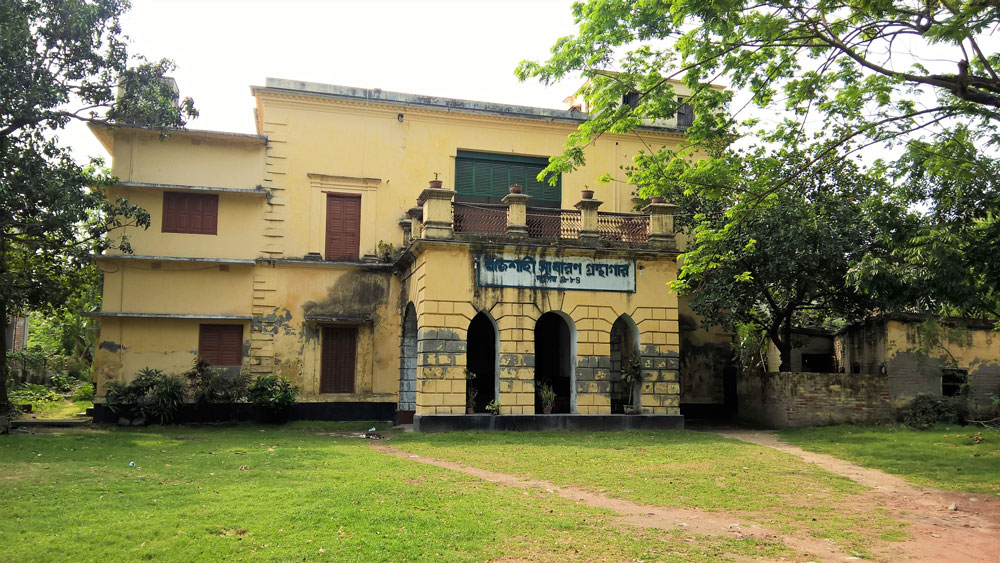
- One of the oldest libraries in Rajshahi. That was formerly known as Rajshahi Sadharon Pustakaloy. In 1975 it has been changed to Rajshahi Public Library.
- Formation: 1884; 142 years ago
- Headquarters: Rajshahi, Bangladesh
- Region served: Bangladesh
- Official language: Bengali

Rajshahi Public Library is a public library in Rajshahi and is one of the oldest libraries in Bangladesh.

== History ==
Rajshahi Public Library was founded by Ananada Nath Roy as Ananada Nath Library in 1866. Ananada Nath Roy was the Raja (king) of Natore. In 1884 the library was renamed to Rajshahi Public Library. The library was supported by Raja Chandra Nath Roy after the death of his father, Raja Ananda Nath Roy. From 1884, Raja Promodanath Roy chaired the library till his death in 1925. From 1925 to 1942, the library was chaired by Kumar Sartkumar Ray. From 1942 to 1943, the chair of the library was the Raja of Natore, Yogindanath Roy. From 1943 to 1952, it was chaired by the Raja of Dighapatia, Babu Kishori Mohon Chowdhury. The library fell into decline following the Partition of India as many of its patrons moved to India.

Since 1952, the library has been managed by the District Commissioner of Rajshahi District. The library lost its records and many of its books and furniture during the Bangladesh Liberation War in 1971. A catalogue of the books was created after the independence of Bangladesh. The library has over 35 thousand books. In 2017, Rajshahi City Corporation announced plans to renovate the library with financial assistance from the Indian government. The plan to demolish the 130-year-old building and replaced it with a brand new library building has generated controversy that time. The new building of the Library inaugurated on March 9, 2026.
