= Akshay Kumar Maitreya =

Indian historian (1861–1930)

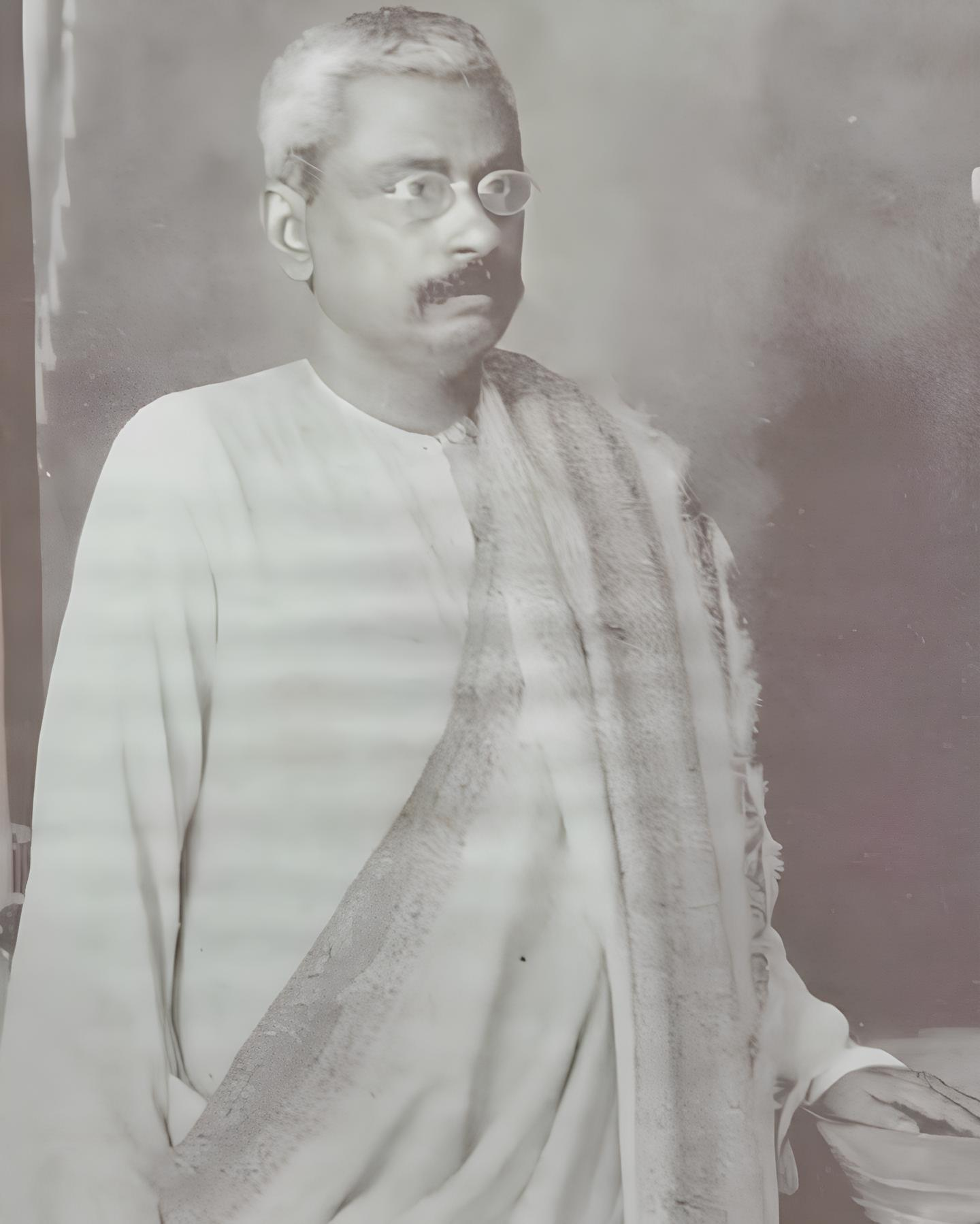
- Born: 1 March 1861; Shimulia, Mirpur Upazila, Kushtia District, Bengal Presidency, British India
- Died: 10 February 1930 (aged 68); Rajshahi, Bengal, British India
- Citizenship: British India
- Education: Boalia English School (1878); Rajshahi College (FA, 1880; BL 1885); Presidency College (BA, 1883)
- Occupations: Historian, lawyer, social worker
- Organization(s): Varendra Research Society and Rajshahi Museum

Akshay Kumar Maitreya (1 March 1861 – 10 February 1930; অক্ষয়কুমার মৈত্রেয় in Bengali) was a British Indian lawyer, historian and social worker.

== Early life and education ==
Maitreya was born in Shimulia in Nawapara of Mirpur Kushtia District (now in Bangladesh) to a family originally from Naogaon district. Much of his education was in Kolkata and Rajshahi. Maitreya started his education at Kumarkhali under Kangal Harinath. At the age of 10, he came to his father Mathura Mohan who was practising at Rajshahi. He passed the entrance in 1878 from Boalia English School, FA in 1880 from Rajshahi College, and a BA in 1883 from Presidency College, and a BL in 1885 from Rajshahi College. He joined the Rajshahi Bar in the same year.

== Work ==
Maitreya served as a commissioner of Rajshahi Municipal Corporation and director of Varendra Research Society. He was instrumental in creating the Rajshahi Museum, Rajshahi. He was also credited for disproving the Black Hole of Calcutta theory used by the colonial British to discredit Siraj Ud Daulah in a seminar organized by the Calcutta Historical Society on 24 March 1916. His most significant work was Gaudalekhamala. It consists the Sanskrit texts (along with their translations in Bengali) of a number of stone and copper-plate inscriptions issued by the Pala emperors.

He was a friend of Rabindranath Tagore, but engaged with him in an argument about whether history based fiction should necessarily represent historical facts correctly. Maitreya, being a historian, called for historical correctitude, while Tagore declared that an artist has freedom to bend historical facts.

Maitreya's historical pursuit and his philanthropic spirit impressed many scholars and institutions in the country and abroad. He was admired by Mahatma Gandhi, Subhas Chandra Bose, Sarojini Naidu, Mahamahopadhyay Hara Prasad Shastri, Volney V. Smith, Kangal Harinath, John Marshall, Ashutosh Mukherjee, Rabindranath Tagore, Hemanta Kumari Debi, Jagadindra Nath Roy, Rajanikanta Sen, Kazi Nazrul Islam, R. C. Majumdar and Nalini Kanta Bhattasali, and many others.

=== Works ===
Maitreya's works include:

- Samarsimha (1883)
- Sitaram Ray (1898)
- Sirajuddaulah (1898)
- Mir Qasim (1906)
- Aitihasik Chitra (Snapshots of History)
- Gaudalekhamala (The epigraphs of Gaud), Rajshahi (1912)
- Phiringi Banik (European Traders) (1922)
- "Sagarika"
- "Rani Bhabani"
