= Ramaprasad Chanda =

Indian anthropologist, historian and archaeologist

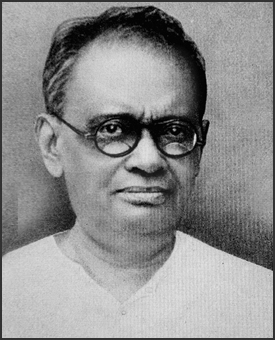
- Ramaprasad Chanda
- Born: 15 August 1873; Sreedharkhola, Vikrampur Pargana, Munshiganj District, Bangladesh
- Died: 28 May 1942 (aged 68); Calcutta, India
- Occupations: Historian and archaeologist

Ramaprasad Chanda (15 August 1873 – 28 May 1942) was an Indian anthropologist, historian and archaeologist from Bengal. A pioneer in his field in South Asia, Chanda's lasting legacy is the Varendra Research Museum, he established in Rajshahi (located in present-day Bangladesh), a leading institute for research on the history of Bengal. He was the first head of the Department of Anthropology at the University of Calcutta from 1920- 1921. He was also a professional archaeologist and worked in the Archaeological Survey of India. Chanda was one of the founders the Indian Anthropological Institute and was its president during 1938–1942. He represented India in the first International Congress of Anthropology held in London in 1934. He had done original research on the somatic characters of Indian populations by using ancient Indian literature and challenged Herbert Hope Risley's theory of Indian races. Riley was the first Census Commissioner of India.

== Biography ==
Chanda was born on August 15, 1873, in present-day Bangladesh. After completing his Bachelor of Arts (BA) degree in 1896 from Scottish Church College in Kolkata, he faced financial difficulties while working as a private tutor. However, he dedicated his spare time to studying history and anthropology at the library. During this period, he contributed on social and anthropological topics in several magazines. Eventually, he secured a position as a history teacher at Hindu School, Kolkata before being transferred to Rajshahi Collegiate School in eastern Bengal in 1905.

== Early career and recognition ==
Chanda gained recognition for challenging Herbert Risley's controversial theory on the origin of Bengalis in the early 1900s.

He conducted anthropometric measurements and studied ancient texts to present an alternate thesis supporting a stronger Aryan lineage among Indians. Chanda collaborated with Sarat Kumar Ray and Akshay Kumar Maitreya on archaeological expeditions in 1910, leading to the establishment of the Varendra Research Society and its museum. He published Gaudarajamala in 1912, the first scientific history of Bengal based on epigraphic evidence.

Chanda's work attracted the attention of John Marshall, Director General of the Archeological Survey of India, leading to a two-year assignment with the Archaeological Survey of India in 1917. He conducted research, exploration, and excavation across India during his ASI tenure. After his assignment in 1919, Chanda relocated to Kolkata following his wife's passing.

== 1921-1932 ==
In 1919, Chanda joined the University of Calcutta as a Lecturer in Ancient Indian History and later became the head of the newly established Department of Anthropology. In 1921, at John Marshall's request he left his university position to become the Superintendent of the Archaeological Section at the Indian Museum in Kolkata, a position he held for over 10 years until his retirement in 1932.

== Dhyana Yoga ==
Chanda's research suggested that philosophical religions in India, including Upanishads, Buddhism, and Jainism, predate the Aryan influence and are rooted in the Indus Valley.

While his theories lacked conclusive evidence, they gained support from Jainist and Buddhist communities. The origin of yoga remains debated, with some scholars acknowledging Chanda's hypothesis but emphasizing the need for further evidence.

Archaeologist Gregory Possehl, who spent over forty years exploring many Indus sites and mentioned Chanda’s observation about the famous priest-king image, noted,

“There are several other yogi images in the corpus of mature Harappan materials... This presents an interesting possibility. Some of the Harappans were devoted to ritual discipline and concentration, this was one of the preoccupations of at least some of their gods.”

== Research ==
Chanda's work focused on the collection and analysis of objective data, such as inscriptions, in order to construct a scientific' history of the region. He emphasized the importance of archaeology as a specialized discipline and promoted the need for Western methods and techniques in systematic and scientific work.

Chanda's Gaudarajamala is considered to be the first scientific history of the region, and he carefully omitted classical legends and mythical characters whose presence could not be proven by hard evidence.

Chanda's work on the characteristics of Indian sculptures starting in the Gupta Period in the fourth century CE, it was covered his 1920 lecture titled Medieval Sculpture in Eastern India. Chanda expounded in his thesis by stating that, since India had different religious traditions, that were more contemplative, and reflecting peaceful calmness through the practice of dhyana Yoga. This was supported by the citation by Marshall in his book Guide to Sanchi. It was the reason that Chanda proposed the fact that a head of a statue found in Mohenjo-Daro with the same contemplative expression that was first Sculptured in the statues of the Gupta period.

Chanda organized one of the first Indus exhibitions in the Indian Museum in Kolkata in 1924. He gained firsthand knowledge of the various relics that were classified and exhibited. He was singularly struck by a head of the male statue from Mohenjo-Daro with half-closed eyes concentrated on the tip of the nose. He concluded that it was portrayed in an attitude of yoga. This happened before the discovery of the well-known Pasupathi seal which portrayed a divine figure. According to Marshall, the deity in the seal was seated in a typical attitude of yoga. Chanda's initial assertions were further reinforced by the discovery of more seals depicting, not only of deities in the sitting positions, but also in standing positions.

Chanda published two monographs of his research on the Indus Valley Civilization (IVC). The first, published in 1926, titled Indus Valley in the Vedic Period, was the earliest attempt to explain the possible collapse of India's first civilization. In his second monograph published in 1929 titled Survival of the Pre-historic Civilization of the Indus Valley, in this publication he substantially abandoned his earlier hypothesis of Aryan invasion. He no longer believed that one type of civilization was destroyed and replaced by another. He also mentioned that the depiction of the attitude of yoga in Indus seals was not accidental. Chanda detected signs of the practice of proto-Buddhism and Jainism in the antiquity.

Chanda's publication in 1930, titled "Exploration in Orissa," documented the presence of the Prajnaparamita sculpture at the ruins of a fort in Choudwar, Cuttack district, Orissa. He described the sculpture as a seated image of Prajnaparamita with a gentle smile, which had been unearthed a few years prior and was worshipped by villagers as their village deity.

In 1934 Chanda embarked on a project to collect and investigate original documents bearing on the life of Raja Ram Mohan Roy, a Bengali social and religious reformer, often called the Father of the Indian Renaissance. Chanda collaborated with J. N. Mazumdar to produce a voluminous work on the life of the Raja that shed new light on his early life and activities. Published in 1938, the book was Chanda’s last major work.

== Proposed theories ==
In January 1934, Chanda attended the 21st Indian Science Congress, held in Bombay, as president of Anthropological Section. His address explored the concept of Sramanism, which revolves around the doctrine of renunciation and is associated with the mendicant and ascetic orders. He traced the origins of Sramanism back to pre-Vedic, pre-Aryan peoples and their practitioners of magic, suggesting that the practice of asceticism can be linked to the initiatory period of seclusion and abstinence observed by shamans. Chanda, along with N.N. Bhattacharya, represented the evolutionary trend in the study of Indic goddesses. They examined Sanskritic texts to establish connections between goddess traditions in India, Egypt, and Mesopotamia. Chanda's work emphasized the names of goddesses to establish India's place in a broader group of societies.

Chanda opposed Risley's theory of the mongolo-dravidian origin of the Bengalis. He proposed that the Bengalis were derived from the homo alpinus type, a brachycephalic population with Aryan or Indo-European speech in the prehistoric period. Chanda suggested that these Indo-Aryans migrated into the lower Gangetic plain from the middle portion of the Gangetic plain, which was occupied by the Vedic Aryans. Furthermore, Chanda's address highlighted the significant role played by the Durga-Kali cult in Bengal, noting that it has traditionally held sway over the renunciation practices of Sramanism.

== Archaeology ==
Chanda acknowledged that ancient Indian history was intertwined with religious and socioeconomic concerns, often embellished with imaginary events. He adopted Lord Acton's view that the purpose of history is to critically investigate and discern truth from falsehood. Chanda's approach to archaeology was based on historicizing tradition, recognizing the contradiction and ambivalence inherent in using tradition as a source of scientific history.

== Legacy ==
The connection between yoga and the Indus Valley was first broached by Chanda. He published various monographs expounding his thesis about the practice of dhyana yoga in the pre-history, but he acknowledged that the archaeological evidence was lacking to support his hypothesis. The resolution of the present controversy regarding the roots of yoga might have to wait the decipherment of the Indus script.

Chanda initially proposed the Aryan invasion theory to explain the decline of the Indus civilization. However, he later revised his hypothesis, envisioning a symbiotic relationship between immigrants and native populations, paving the way for the concept of a mixed Hindu civilization.

== Publications ==
=== Books ===
- Gaudarajmala, Rajshahi: Varendra Research Society (1912)
- Indo Aryan Races, Rajshahi: Varendra Research Society (1916
- Medieval Indian Sculpture in the British Museum (1936)
- Letters and Documents Relating to the Life of Raja Rammohan Roy (1938)
- Itihase bangal
- Gour-bibaran

=== Journals ===
- Chanda, Ramaprasad (1917). "Alpine Strain in the Bengali People" (PDF). Nature. 98 (2469): 503–504. Bibcode:1917Natur..98..491C. doi:10.1038/098491a0.
- Chanda, Ramāprasād (July 1919). "Khāravela". Journal of the Royal Asiatic Society. 51 (3): 395–399. doi:10.1017/S0035869X00053107. S2CID 250345857.
- Chanda, Ramaprasad (July 1920). "Taxila Inscription of the year 136". Journal of the Royal Asiatic Society. 52 (3): 319–324. doi:10.1017/S0035869X00148191. S2CID 163213485.
- Chanda, Rai Bahadur Ramaprasad (1934). "Art in Orissa". Journal of the Royal Society of Arts. 82 (4265): 1011–1028. ISSN 0035-9114. JSTOR 41360187.
