= Abdur Rahman Khan (educator) =

Bengali academic and education service officer (1878–1939)

Abdur Rahman Khan was a Bengali academic and education service officer.

== Early life ==
Khan was born on 7 November 1878 in Dumur, Sirajganj District, Bengal Presidency, British India. In 1897, he graduated from Natore Maharaja Jagadindranath High School and was awarded the Haji Muhammad Mohsin scholarship. In 1902, he graduated from Rajshahi College and received a scholarship from the Gilchrist Educational Trust. He was forced to stop his higher education after the death of his grandfather.

== Career ==
In 1902, Khan became as assistant teacher at Rajshahi Collegiate School. He joined the department of Provincial Education as a deputy inspector in 1907 stationed in Backergunge District. He later served in Naogaon District. He was promoted to District Inspector of Schools in 1932.

Khan would later be promoted to Divisional Inspector of Schools. He was placed in Rajshahi Division and then Chittagong Division. In 1932, he was awarded the title of Khan Bahadur by the British Raj for his service to education and retired from service two years later. He established the Mugbelai Lutfia High School in Sirajganj District.

Khan served as commissioner of Rajshahi Municipality (now Rajshahi City).

== Death ==
Khan died on 18 July 1939 in Rajshahi District, Bengal Presidency, British India.
