= Rajshahi Collegiate School =

- রাজশাহী কলেজিয়েট স্কুল

Location
- Sonadighir More, Boalia; Rajshahi; Bangladesh; 24.3657°N 88.5968°E

Information
- Former names: Bawlia English School (1828-1836), Rajshahi Zilla School (1836-1873)
- Type: Public
- Motto: Bengali: শিক্ষা, স্বাস্থ্য, সমৃদ্ধি (Education, Health, Prosperity)
- Established: 1828; 198 years ago
- Founder: Lord William Bentinck
- Status: Active
- School board: Board of Intermediate and Secondary Education, Rajshahi
- Session: January - December
- School number: EIIN: 126456
- School code: 1000
- Headmaster: Md. Bairul Islam (Incharge)
- Teaching staff: 47
- Gender: Boys
- Enrollment: approximately 1800
- Classes: 3rd grade - 12th grade
- Education system: Single-sex education
- Language: Bengali
- Schedule: Morning Shift, Day Shift
- Hours in school day: approximately 4.5 hours
- Campus: Urban
- Area: 3,936 square metres
- Colors: White(Shirt & Shoes); Khaki (Pant); Red (Sweater)
- Alumni: Rajshahi Collegiate School Alumni Association
- Former pupil(s): Collegiateian(s)
- Website: rcs1828.vercel.app rcs1.edu.bd

Rajshahi Collegiate School (Bengali: রাজশাহী কলেজিয়েট স্কুল) is a public boys' school located in Shaheb Bazar, Rajshahi, a metropolitan city in northern Bangladesh. Established in 1828, it is the oldest school in the country.

== History ==
Rajshahi Collegiate School is the oldest educational institution in Rajshahi city. Rajshahi Collegiate School was established in 1828. The school was nationalised by the provincial government of Bengal and was converted into a government zilla (or district) school on 20 June 1836

In 1873 the Zilla School was given the status of an Intermediate College, and F.A. courses were introduced into its curriculum. With further development this college was accorded "first-grade rank" in 1878, which meant that it could teach B.A. courses and be affiliated to the University of Calcutta. Later the college part got separated and was named as Rajshahi College.

After completing MA in philosophy from Presidency College, Kolkata in 1895, Khan Bahadur Ahsanullah went on to serve as the first Muslim headmaster of Rajshahi Collegiate School, from 1904 to 1907.

== Buildings and sites ==
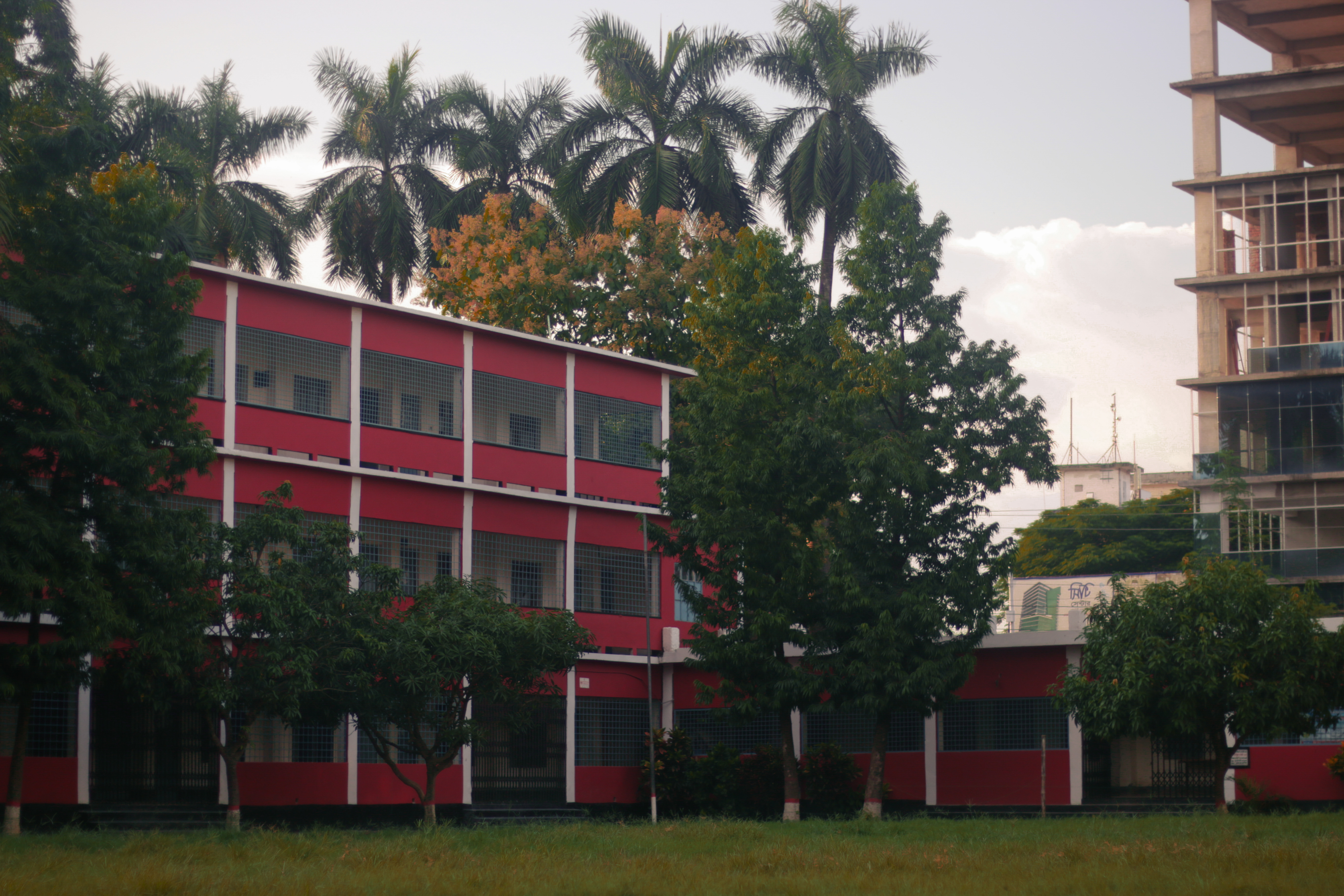
Scout building in 2018
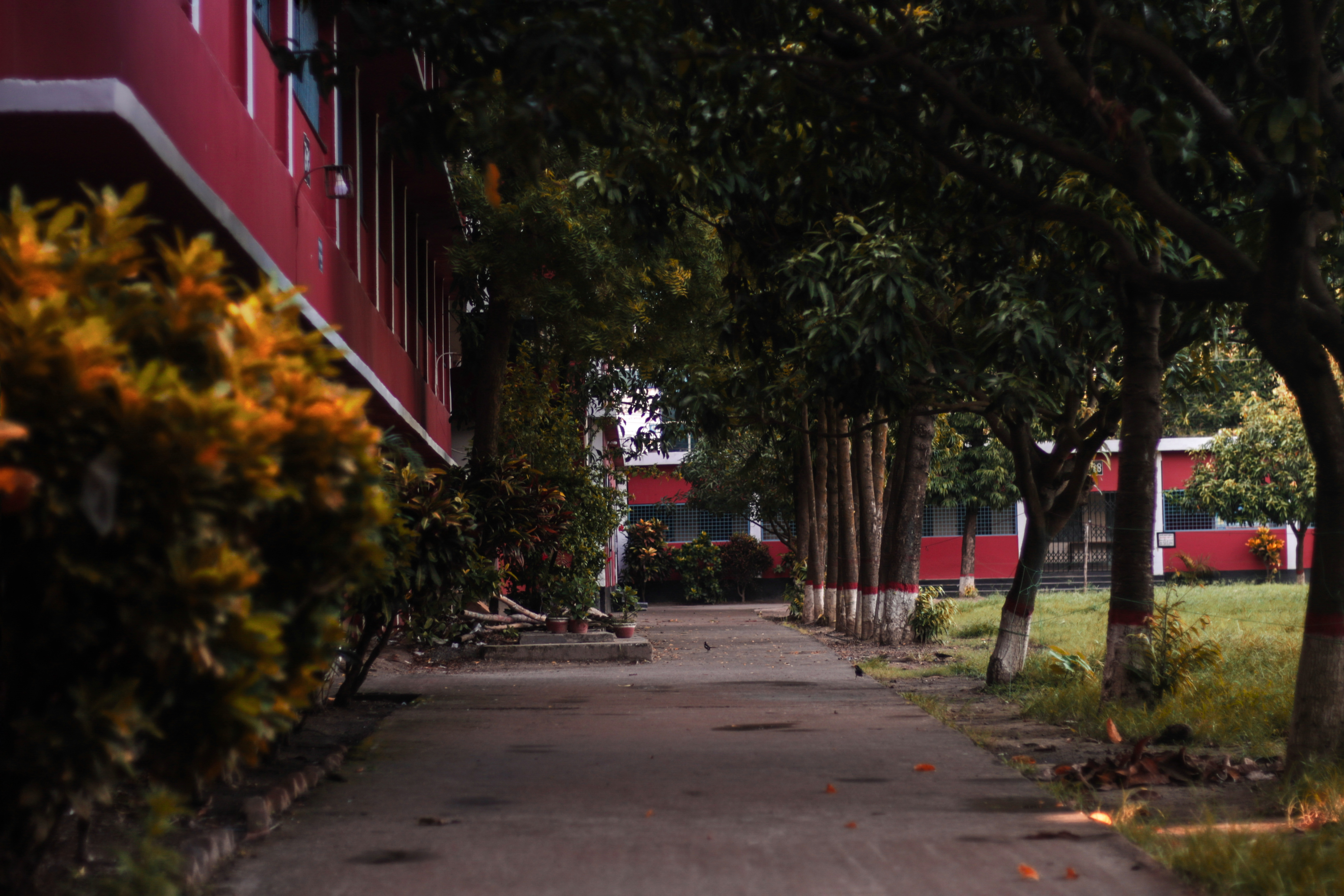
Rajshahi Collegiate School in 2018

== Headmasters ==
SL	Headmaster's name	Working period start	Working period end
1	Sri Sarda Prasad Basu	1836	1844
2	Mr. Riz	1844	1852
3	Sri Hargobind Sen	1852	1864
4	Sri Jadunath Mukherjee	1864	1870
5	Sri Kalinath Dey	1870	1872
6	Sri Govinda Chandra Maitra	1872	1873
7	Sri Hargobind Sen	1873	1879
8	Sri Kalikumar Das	1879	1891
9	Sri Loknath Chakraborty	1891	1892
10	Sri Shashi Vushan Sen	1892	1898
11	Sri Joy Gopal Dey	1898	1902
12	Sri Rajendranath Banerjee	1902	1904
13	Sir Khan Bahadur Ahsanullah	1904	1907
14	Sri Brajaballav Dutta	1907	1911
15	Sri Avaycharan Das	1911	1913
16	Sri Chintaharan Chakraborty	1913	1924
17	Sri Dhirendranath Sen	1924	1926
18	Sri Prasanya Kumar Dev	1926	1931
19	Sri Bijay Chandra Sen	1931	1934
20	Sri Satish Chandra Sen	1934	1939
21	Sri Manimohan Sengupta	1940	1941
22	Mohammad Asad Abdul Mahmud	1941	1944
23	Mohammed Hidyatul Islam	1944	1946
24	Sri Bijay Kumar Bhattacharya	1946	1947
25	M. Khalil	1947	1951
26	M.A. Latif	1951	1956
27	A.K.M Hashem	1956	1958
28	Abdul Jobbar Ahmed	1958	1959
29	M. Imran Ali	1959	1966
30	Mohammed Abdur Razzak	1966	1967
31	Mohammed Khalilur Rahman	1967	1972
32	Muhammad Izharul Haque	1972	1974
33	Rashid Ahmed	1974	1978
34	Mohammed Bahadur Ali Sarker	1978	1979
35	Mohammed Izabul Haque	1980	1983
36	Mohammed Ramzan Ali	1983	1987
37	Muhammad Anowar Hossain	1988	
38	Mohammed Nawshad Ali	1988	1992
39	Mrs. Rawshon Jahan	1992	1998
40	Mohammed Entazur Rahman	1998	2000
41	Mohammed Abul Kashem	2000	2002
42	Mohammed Hafizur Rahman	2002	2004
43	Mohammed Abul Kashem	2004	2006
44	Mohammed Golam Hossain	05.03.2006	30.10.2007
45	Dr. Mst. Nurjahan Begum	06.11.2007	15.10.2025
46	Sujit Kumar Devnath (Incharge)	15.10.2025	30.12.2025
47	Md. Bairul Islam (Incharge)	30.12.2025	present

== Notable alumni ==
- A. K. Khandker
- Ramaprasad Chanda
- Sarat Kumar Ray
- A. H. M. Khairuzzaman Liton
- Fazlul Haque
- Akshay Kumar Maitreya
- Khademul Bashar Bir Uttom, chief of the Bangladesh Air Force
- Mizanur Rahman Minu
- Mrinal Haque
- Najib Tareque
- Ritwik Ghatak, film director, screenwriter, actor and playwright
- Faruq Mahfuz Anam (James), singer-songwriter, guitarist, composer and playback singer
- Syed Nawab Ali Chowdhury, politician and writer
