= Varendra Research Museum =

Museum and research centre in Rajshahi, Bangladesh

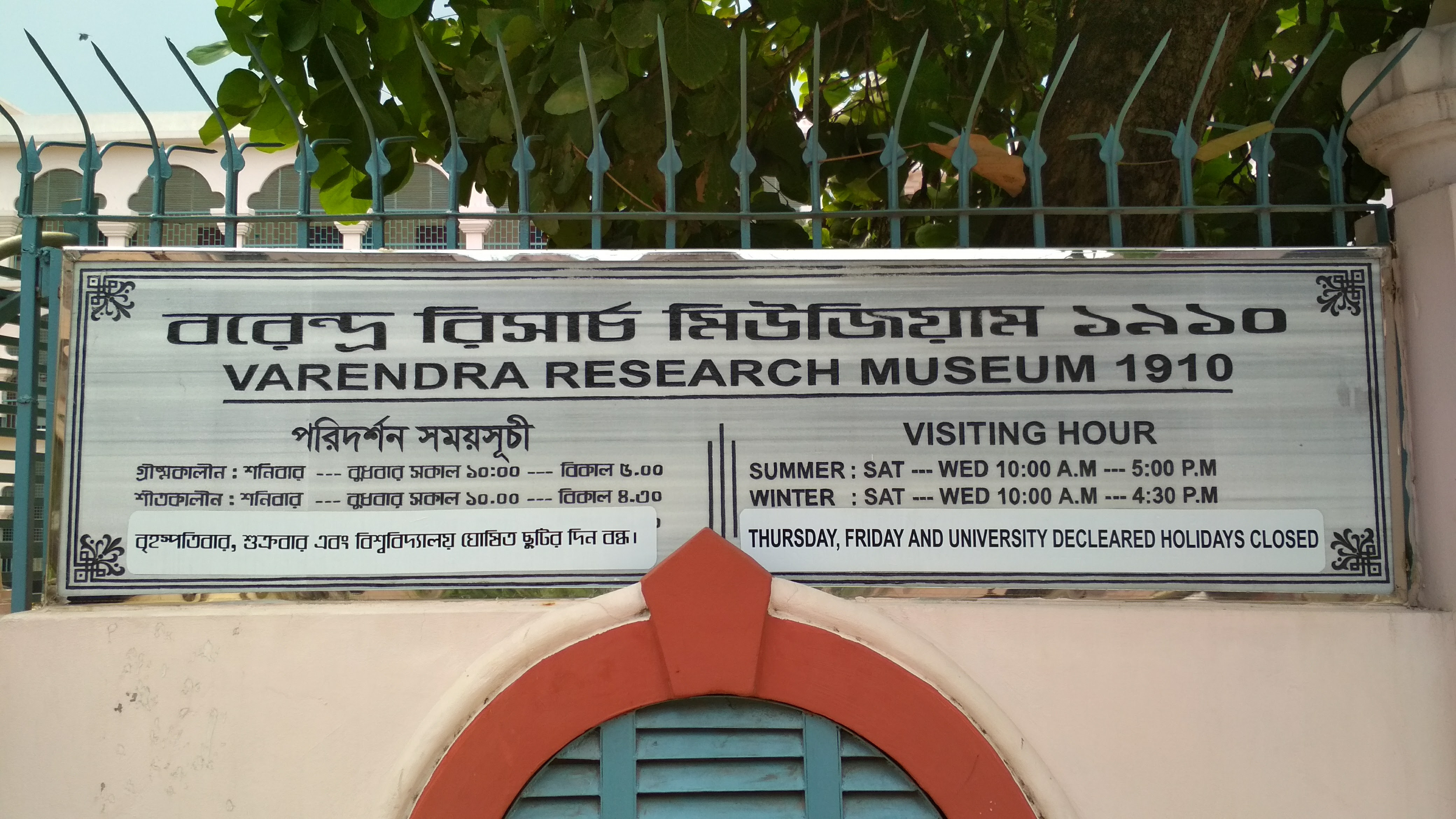
- Timetable of Varendra Research Museum

- Location within Bangladesh
- Established: 10 November 1910
- Location: Rajshahi, Bangladesh
- Coordinates: 24.367106°N 88.592382°E
- Founder: Lord Carmichael
- Owner: University of Rajshahi
- Website: ru.ac.bd

Varendra Museum (Bengali: বরেন্দ্র জাদুঘর) is a museum, research centre, and popular visitor attraction at the heart of Rajshahi and maintained by Rajshahi University in Bangladesh.

It is considered the oldest museum in Bangladesh. It was the first museum to be established in East Bengal in 1910. The museum started out as the collection for Varendra Anushandan Samiti (or Varendra Investigation Society) and got its current name in 1919. Varendra refers to an ancient Janapada roughly corresponding to modern northern Bangladesh. The Rajahs of Rajshahi and Natore, notably prince Sharat Kumar Ray, donated their personal collections to Varendra Museum.

== History ==
Varendra (or Barind) was a region of Bengal, now in Bangladesh. It included the Pundravardhana or Pundra Kingdom region. According to Alexander Cunningham, the boundary of Varendra was the Ganges and the Mahananda on the west, the Karatoya on the east, the Padma on the south, and the land between Koochbihar and the Terai on the north. The Varendra Brahmins originated from this region.

The settlement of Varendra, spoken as Janakabhu (fatherland), was one of the most flourishing territories of the ancient Indian sub-continent. Literary and epigraphic evidence show that a separate school of artisans earned wide reputation here during the reign of the Pala dynasty and the streams of art making were uninterrupted until the Sena dynasty.

Some of the leading and enlightened citizens of Rajshahi felt the need for establishing an institution that would explore the past of this region. Hence, the Varendra Research Society was established in 1910. The founder of the society, Sarat Kumar Ray, the scion of the Dighapatiya royal family accompanied by Aksaya Kumar Maitreya, a leading lawyer and renowned historian; Ramaprasad Chanda, a reputed scholar in history, art and archaeology; and others explored archaeological and historical artefacts excavated in villages of Rajshahi.

Kumar believed that if a centre of archaeological research was to be established at Rajshahi, the finds should be preserved there as the nucleus of a local museum. Accordingly, to collect, preserve, study and research the history and culture of ancient and medieval Bengal in general, and of Varendra region in particular, the three individuals mentioned above strived to establish a museum. The museum was formally inaugurated on 27 September 1910 and was registered in 1914 in accordance with the Indian Society Act, 1860.

An excavation at Sompur Bihara was started by the society along with the University of Calcutta in 1923. In 1964, the museum became a part of Rajshahi University.

== Activity ==
In February 2025, the British Council concluded a four month Museum training programme along with the UK Department for Culture, Media, and Sport at the Varendra Research Museum in Rajshahi.

== Collection ==
- Gallery One has collections from the Indus Valley civilization, and some of its 265 items from Sompur. It also contains old Sanskrit, Arabic and Persian scripts.
- Gallery Two has Buddhist and Hindu stone sculptures and modern wood sculptures.
- Galleries Three and Four display stone sculptures of Hindu gods and goddesses.
- Gallery Five offers mostly Buddhist sculptures.
- Gallery Six shows Arabic, Persian, Sanskrit and old Bengali stone inscriptions and sculptured stones of the Muslim period.
- A gallery has been added displaying the indigenous and tribal culture of Rajshahi region.

== Site surroundings ==
In the existing site, three main structures were found. The front part is the Varendra Research Museum and the structural system is load-bearing brick wall. The linear rectangular building has two major functions: Administration and the Library. There is a Residential Block for officers and staff with a limited number of curators and the director. These structures have been constructed with brick. There is a garden in front of the director's residence with large old trees scattered among the entire site.

Services: Gas, Water, Electricity is available with Internet, Postal, Cable and Phone Services.

Surrounding built form: North: Hatem Kha boro mosque. South: Chest disease hospital Jadhughor mor, Choto kutir, Boro kutir and Padma river East: Rajshahi Govt. Hospital, Shaheb bazar road and Rajshahi Railway Station West: Residential zone, shops.

== Museum extension ==
Varenda Research Museum was built in 1910 with the support of Maharaja of Dighapatia. The museum has historical significance and is also a heritage site of Bangladesh. The century-old museum demands restoration and the existing gallery space is not adequate to preserve and display all the artefacts. Also the Archaeological sites were found recently and the artefacts are increasing day by day. The restoration program of existing museum has already begun. With the rise in number of artefacts in its inventory throughout the recent years and its added functional demand, the extension of this project has become inevitable to protect the old museum and to preserve the artefacts that has helped us learn more about our very own past.

== Gallery ==
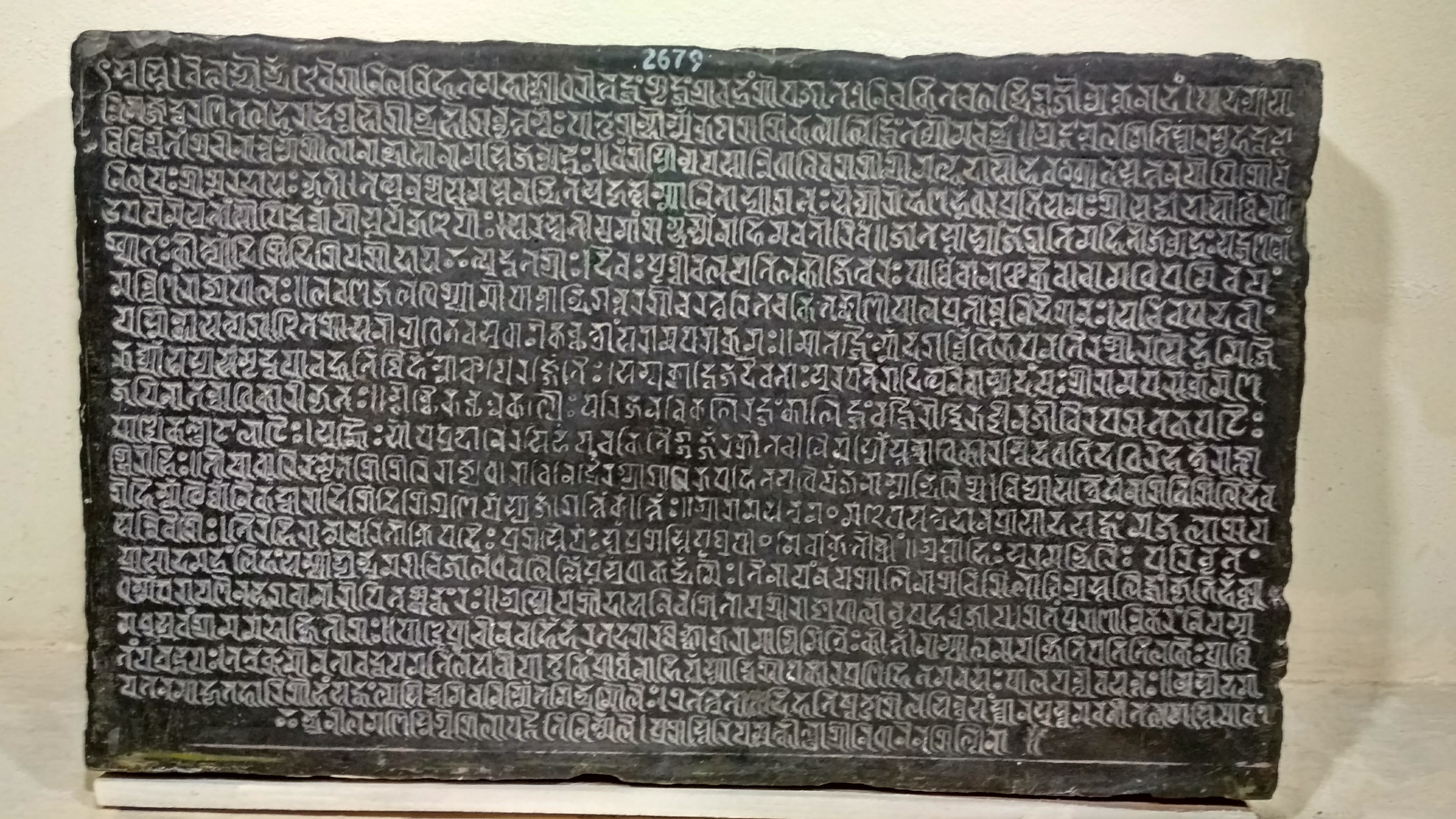
haturia Inscription of Rajapala at the Museum

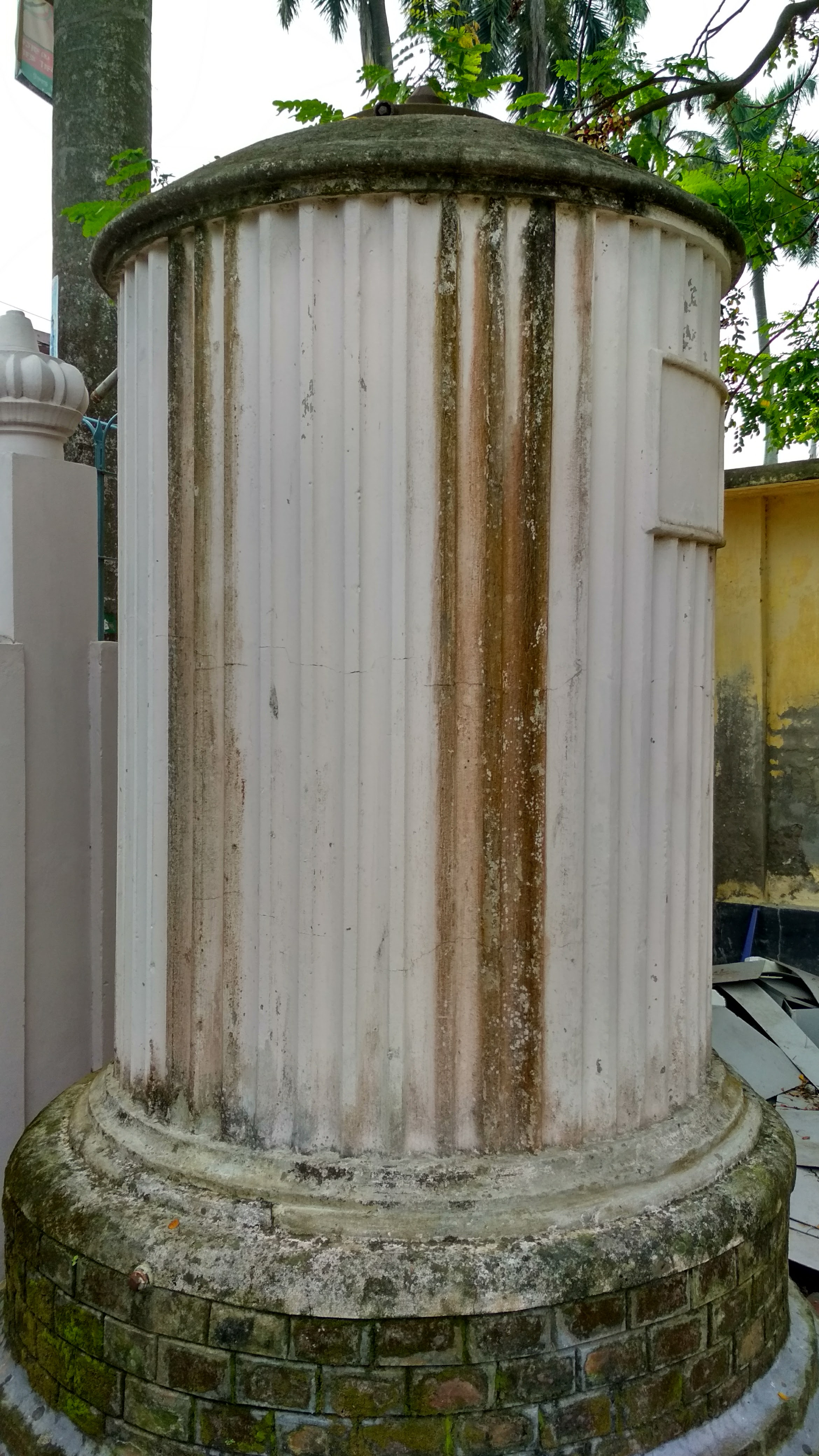
Dhopkol at the Museum

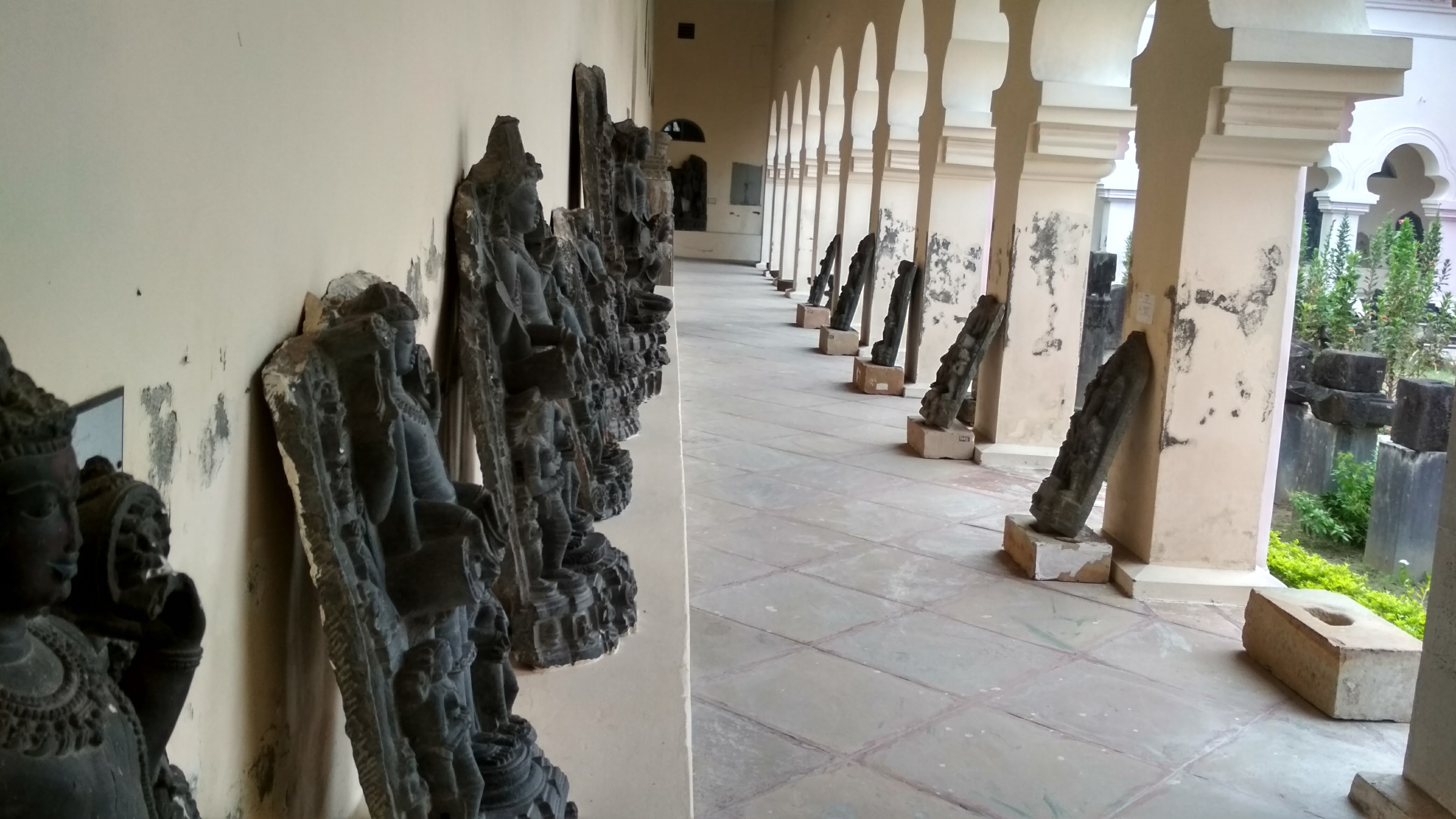
Corridor of the Museum

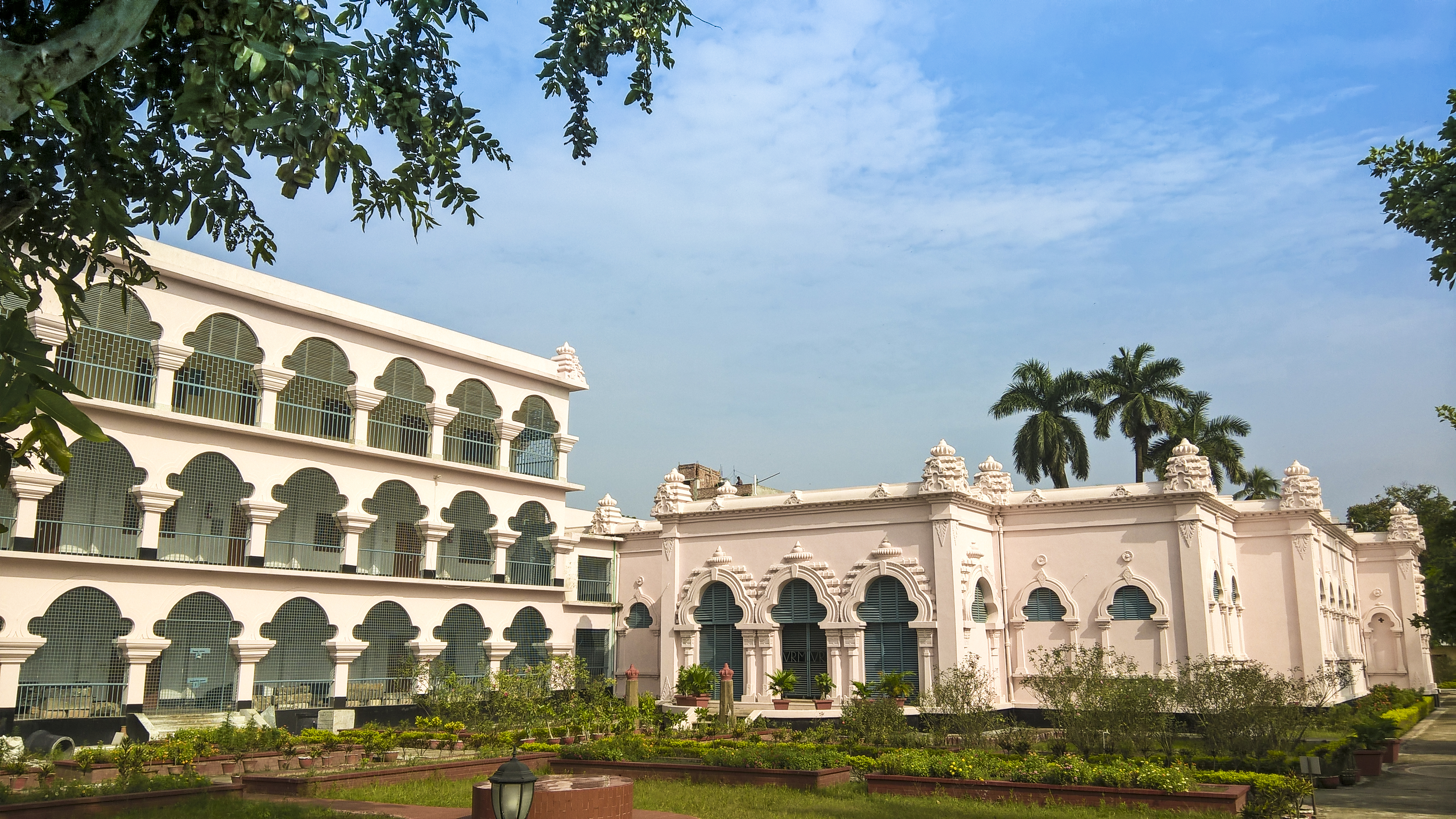
Front view

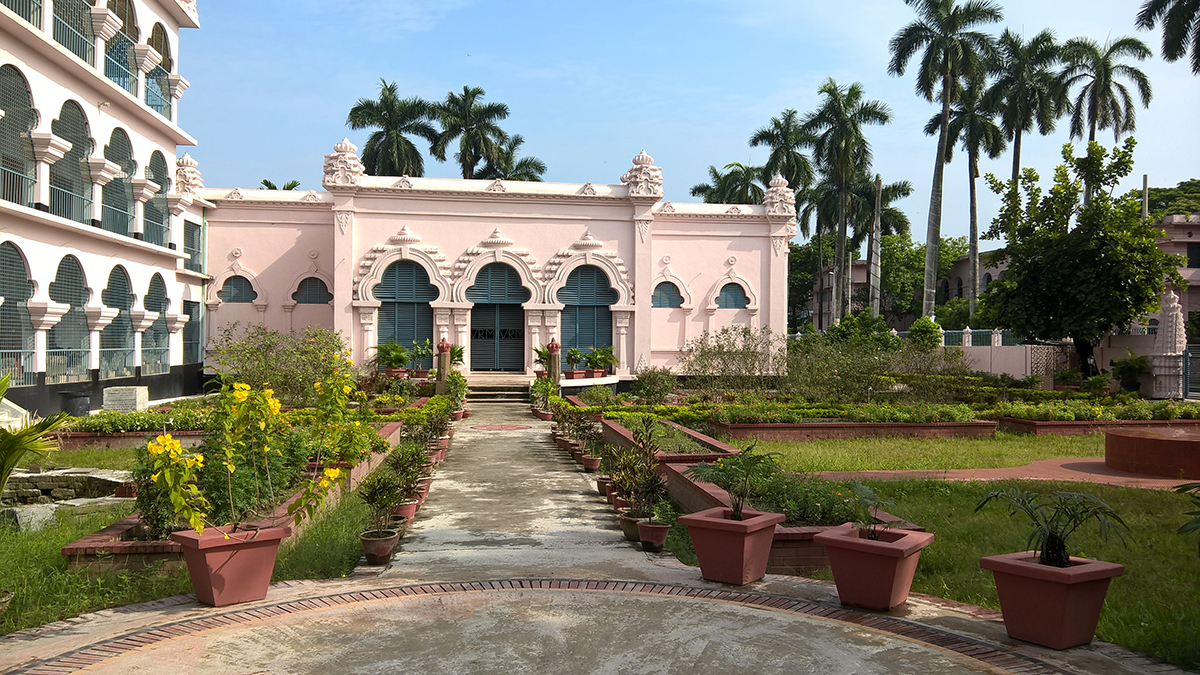
Front view

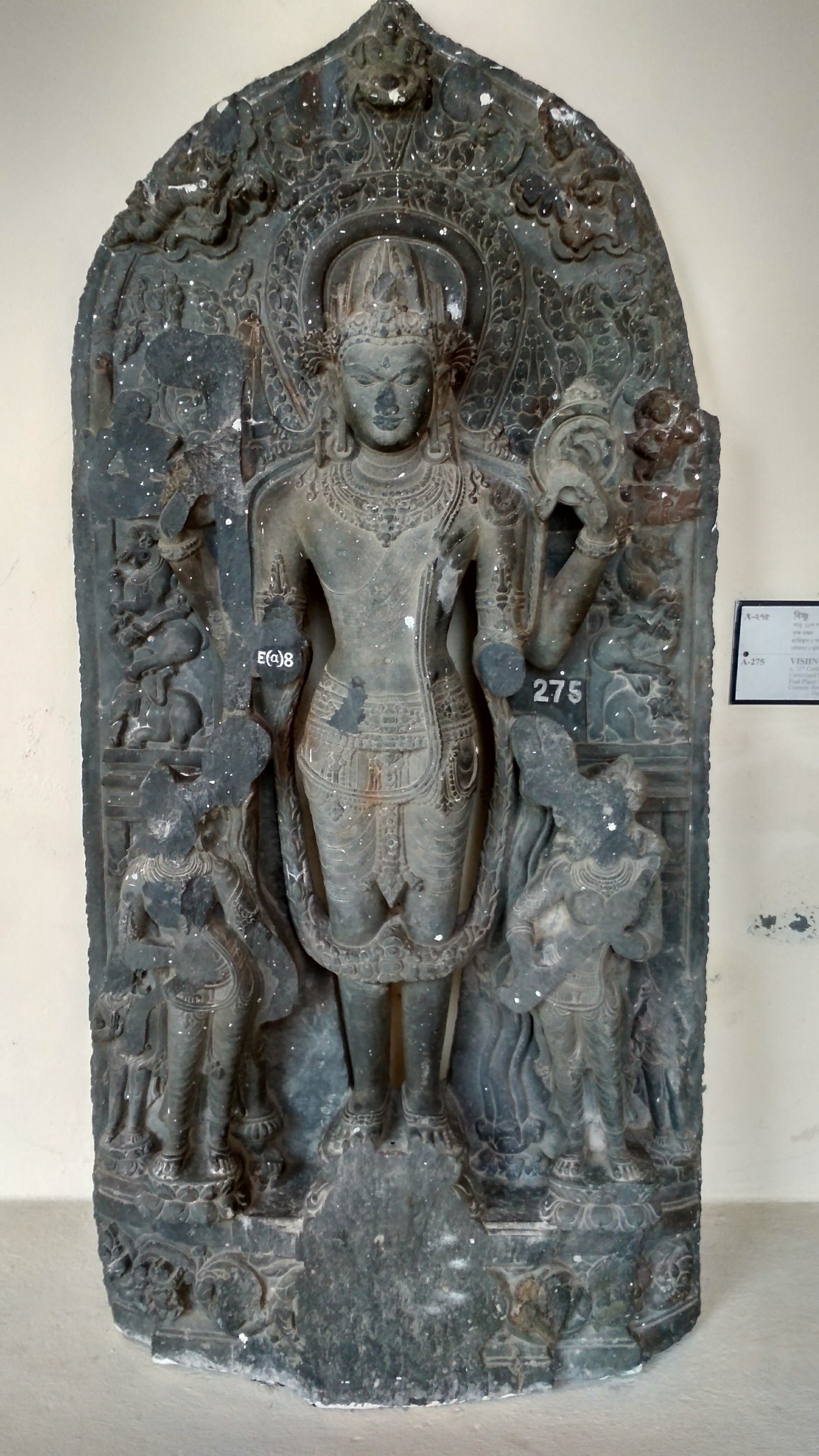
Vishnu at the Museum

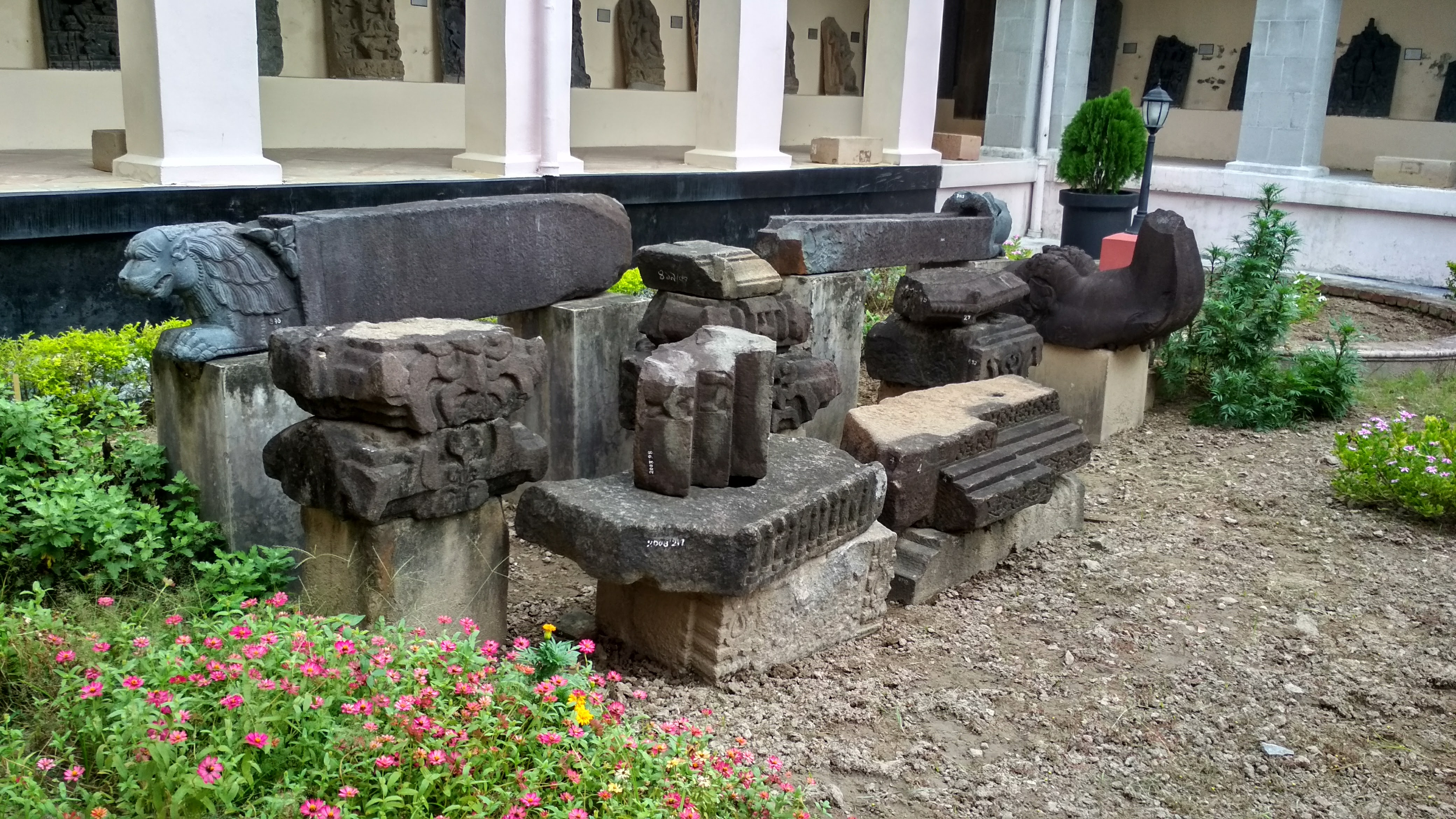
Inner side of the Museum
