= Natore-2 =

Constituency of Bangladesh's Jatiya Sangsad

Coordinates: 24.42°N 89.00°E

- Constituency for the Jatiya Sangsad
- District: Natore District
- Division: Rajshahi Division
- Electorate: 343,986 (2018)

Current constituency
- Created: 1984
- Party: Bangladesh Nationalist Party
- Member: Ruhul Quddus Talukdar
- ← 58 Natore-1 60 Natore-3 →

Natore-2 is a constituency represented in the Jatiya Sangsad (National Parliament) of Bangladesh since 2026 by Ruhul Quddus Talukdar of the Bangladesh Nationalist Party.

== Boundaries ==
The constituency encompasses Natore Sadar Upazila and Naldanga Upazila.

== History ==
The constituency was created in 1984 from a Rajshahi constituency when the former Rajshahi District was split into four districts: Nawabganj, Naogaon, Rajshahi, and Natore.

== Members of Parliament ==
Election	Member	Party
1986	Mohammad Mujibur Rahman	Jatiya Party
1991	Shankar Gobind Chowdhury	Awami League
Feb 1996	Ruhul Quddus Talukdar	Bangladesh Nationalist Party
2001	Ruhul Quddus Talukder Dulu	Bangladesh Nationalist Party
2008	Ahad Ali Sarker	Awami League
2014	Shafiqul Islam Shimul	Awami League
2026	Ruhul Quddus Talukder Dulu	Bangladesh Nationalist Party

== Elections ==
=== Elections in the 2010s ===
Shafiqul Islam Shimul was elected unopposed in the 2014 general election after opposition parties withdrew their candidacies in a boycott of the election.

=== Elections in the 2000s ===
General Election 2008: Natore-2
Party	Candidate	Votes	%	±%
AL	Ahad Ali Sarker	135,432	54.2	+13.8
BNP	Sabina Yasmin	111,866	44.8	−7.5
IAB	Azizar Rahman Khan Chowdhury	1,214	0.5	N/A
PDP	Md. Abdus Salam	699	0.3	N/A
Zaker Party	Md. Shohidul Islam	570	0.2	N/A
Majority		23,566	9.4	−2.4
Turnout		249,781	91.1	+3.2
AL gain from BNP				

General Election 2001: Natore-2
Party	Candidate	Votes	%	±%
BNP	Ruhul Quddus Talukdar	109,196	52.3	+16.8
AL	Hanif Ali Sheikh	84,498	40.4	−9.8
IJOF	Mojibur Rahman Sentu	15,012	7.2	N/A
Bangladesh Progressive Party	Abdur Rashid Khan Chowdhury	250	0.1	N/A
Majority		24,698	11.8	+6.9
Turnout		208,956	87.9	+1.8
BNP hold				

=== Elections in the 1990s ===
General Election June 1996: Natore-2
Party	Candidate	Votes	%	±%
BNP	Ruhul Quddus Talukdar	58,500	35.5	+16.7
AL	Ahad Ali Sarker	50,455	30.6	+4.7
JP(E)	Mojibur Rahman Sentu	37,042	22.5	+4.4
Jamaat	Md. Yunus Ali	18,169	11.0	−13.2
Zaker Party	Sirajul Alam	271	0.2	−0.4
FP	Md. Amirul Islam Sarkar	254	0.2	N/A
Majority		8,045	4.9	+3.2
Turnout		164,691	86.1	+12.5
BNP gain from AL				

General Election 1991: Natore-2
Party	Candidate	Votes	%	±%
AL	Shankar Gobind Chowdhury	34,882	25.9	
Jamaat	Md. Yunus Ali	32,590	24.2	
BNP	Md. Sirajul Islam	25,324	18.8	
JP(E)	Mojibur Rahman Sentu	24,331	18.1	
Independent	Khandakar Zubair Hossain	9,683	7.2	
JSD	Kamrul Islam	5,738	4.3	
Bangladesh Muslim League (Kader)	Md. Shafiuddin Sarder	1,236	0.9	
Zaker Party	Md. Sirajul Islam	787	0.6	
NAP (Muzaffar)	Md. Anwar Hossain	164	0.1	
Majority		2,292	1.7	
Turnout		134,735	73.6	
AL gain from JP(E)				
