= Md. Abdul Quddus =

Bangladeshi politician (1946–2023)

- মোঃ আব্দুল কুদ্দুস

Member of the Bangladesh Parliament for Natore-4
- In office 25 January 2009 – 30 August 2023
- Preceded by: Mozammel Haque
- Succeeded by: Siddiqur Rahman Patwari
- In office 23 June 1996 – 22 June 2001
- Preceded by: Ekramul Alam
- In office 1991 – November 1995
- Preceded by: Md. Abul Kasem Sarker

Personal details
- Born: 31 October 1946 Natore, Rajshahi Division, Bengal Province, British India
- Died: 30 August 2023 (aged 76) Dhaka, Bangladesh
- Party: Bangladesh Awami League

Md. Abdul Quddus (31 October 1946 – 30 August 2023) was a Bangladesh Awami League politician. He served as the Jatiya Sangsad member representing the Natore-4 constituency for five terms during 1991–1995, 1996–2001 and finally since 2008 until his death in 2023.

== Early life ==
Quddus was born on 31 October 1946.

== Career ==
Quddus was elected to the parliament from Natore-4 for five terms as a Bangladesh Awami League candidate. On 17 January 2016, he recovered bribes given to Jubo League and returned them to the villagers, the villagers gave the bribe for electricity connections to their homes.

== Death ==
Md. Abdul Quddus died on 30 August 2023, at the age of 76.
