= Shafiqul Islam Shimul =

Bangladeshi politician

- শফিকুল ইসলাম শিমুল

Member of the Bangladesh Parliament for Natore-2
- In office 29 January 2014 – 6 August 2024
- Preceded by: Ahad Ali Sarker
- Succeeded by: Ruhul Quddus Talukdar

Personal details
- Born: 3 July 1976 (age 50)

Shafiqul Islam Shimul (born 3 July 1976) is a Bangladesh Awami League politician and a former Jatiya Sangsad member representing the Natore-2 constituency in 2014.

== Early life ==
Shimul was born on 3 July 1976. He has an LLB degree.

== Career ==
In July 2010, The Daily Star reported that Shariful Islam Ramjan and Shimul, president and general secretary of the Natore District unit of the Jubo League, controlled a syndicate that manipulated and controlled the tender process at Bangladesh Water Development Board. The syndicate was involved in corruption that harmed the dredging of rivers like Narod river in Natore District.

Shimul was elected to the parliament from Natore-2 on 5 January 2014 as an Awami League candidate. He was elected unopposed after the election was boycotted by all major opposition parties. In 2014, he was charged in a murder case but his name was later withdrawn from the charge sheet.

On 13 August 2015, Shimul and his supporters snatched a criminal, Redwan Sabbir, in handcuffs from Rapid Action Battalion custody after getting into a verbal argument with the law enforcement agency.

On 11 April 2016, Shimul's supports attacked a rebel candidate of Awami League who was standing for Halsa Union Parishad chairperson post. In October 2016, he claimed that he got Shafiqul Islam Ramjan elected chairperson of Natore Sadar Upazila on 17 February 2014.

Shimul campaigned for A. H. M. Khairuzzaman Liton for the mayor of Rajshahi post in July 2018.

Shimul at the public rally on 17 December said that only those who vote for Awami League will be allowed to vote in the upcoming national elections on 30 December 2018. After his statements were published in the Prothom Alo his supports in Chhatra League prevented the distribution of newspaper in Natore District. He was re-elected from Natore-2 as a candidate of Awami League on 30 December 2018. He received 262,745 votes and his nearest rival, Sabina Yasmin of Bangladesh Nationalist Party, received 13,197 votes.

Shimul became a member of the parliamentary standing committee on Railways Ministry's sub committee formed to investigate tender manipulation at the Ministry of Railways in October 2020.

Shimul's nephew, Nafiul Islam Antar, was arrested for assaulting an engineer of Natore Water Development Board. Antar assaulted the engineer after he criticised a construction work for the Board completed by his father, Mir Amirul Islam Jahan, for poor quality. Nafiul Islam Antar is a contractor and leader of Bangladesh Awami Swechasebak League and his father is the treasurer of the Natore District unit of the Awami League.
