= Mozammel Haque (Natore politician) =

Bangladeshi politician (died 2023)

- মোজাম্মেল হক

Member of Parliament for Natore-4
- In office 28 October 2001 – 27 October 2006
- Preceded by: Md. Abdul Quddus
- Succeeded by: Md. Abdul Quddus

Personal details
- Born: 1955/1956
- Died: 12 January 2023 (aged 67) Natore District, Bangladesh
- Party: Bangladesh Nationalist Party

Mozammel Haque (1955/1956 – 12 January 2023) was a Bangladesh Nationalist Party politician and a Jatiya Sangsad member representing the Natore-4 constituency during 2001–2006.

== Career ==
Haque was elected to parliament from Natore-4 as a Bangladesh Nationalist Party (BNP) candidate in 2001. He received 111,626 votes while his nearest rival, Md. Abdul Quddus of the Awami League, received 79,450 votes. He was the president of Gurudaspur Upazila unit of BNP.

Haque contested the 2008 general election as a candidate of Bangladesh Nationalist Party but lost to Quddus of the Awami League. Haque received 115,409 votes while Quddus received 160,549 votes.

Haque boycotted the 2014 election along with the rest of Bangladesh Nationalist Party and Md. Abdul Quddus was elected unopposed from Natore-4.

Haque was an alternate candidate of the Bangladesh Nationalist Party from Natore-4 in the 2018 general election. The nomination went to Abdul Aziz, chairman of Gurudaspur Upazila, who lost to Md. Abdul Quddus.

== Death ==
Haque died in Gurudaspur Municipality, Natore District on 12 January 2023, at the age of 67.
