= Pabna Sugar Mill =

- Abbreviation: PSM
- Formation: 1992
- Type: Sugar mill
- Legal status: State-owned
- Headquarters: Pabna, Bangladesh
- Region served: Bangladesh
- Official language: Bengali
- Parent organization: Bangladesh Sugar and Food Industries Corporation

Pabna Sugar Mill (Bengali: পাবনা চিনি কল লিমিটেড) is a state-owned Sugar mill in Ishwardi Upazila, Pabna District. It is owned by the Bangladesh Sugar and Food Industries Corporation.

The government closed the mill in 2020 saying it will be reopened after modernization. Pabna Sugar Mill Workers Union represented the workers of the mill.

== History ==
The construction of Pabna Sugar Mill started on 26 December 1992 with test production starting in 1996. The mill started commercial production in 1997 with 15 thousand tons of annual production.

Workers of Pabna Sugar Mill held protests in February 2018 against Nitol-Tata group which had purchased large tracts of land near the sugar mill. Md Tofazzal Hossain, managing director of Pabna Sugar Mill, also opposed the project by Nitol-Tata.

Pabna Sugar Mill had 400 million BDT in unsold sugar in 2020 and the mill was not able to explain why it could not sell them beyond poor planning.

On 2 December 2020, the government of Bangladesh ordered Bangladesh Sugar and Food Industries Corporation to close Pabna Sugar Mill due to a number of reasons. The mill had four billion BDT in debt which has rises to seven billion BDT in 2023. Around the same time, Bangladesh Sugar and Food Industries Corporation was also ordered to close Panchagarh Sugar Mill Limited, Shyampur Sugar Mills, Setabganj Sugar Mill, and Kushtia Sugar Mills. Local sugarcane farmers and workers of the mill protested the decision to close the mill. Sanat Kumar Saha, Chairperson of Bangladesh Sugar and Food Industries Corporation, announced plans to reopen the mill after modernization. Some had to sell their corps to North Bengal Sugar Mills while.

The Pabna Sugar Mill never made a profit during the nearly 30 years it was running from 1992 to 2020. The mill transferred around 600 employees to various state owned sugar mills. Pabna District Sugarcane Farmers' Association and Bangladesh Sugar Industry Corporation Workers-Employees Federation called for the mill to be reopened.

Despite being closed, the government was spending money for utilities and maintenance of the mill. It is maintained by a staff of 61 including 30 security personnel. Prothom Alo asked the government of Bangladesh to investigate why Bangladesh Sugar and Food Industries Corporation was spending millions to build Effluent Treatment Plants in Pabna Sugar Mill and other closed state owned sugar mills.
