= Natore-4 =

Constituency of Bangladesh's Jatiya Sangsad

Coordinates: 24.31°N 89.17°E

- Constituency for the Jatiya Sangsad
- District: Natore District
- Division: Rajshahi Division
- Electorate: 371,788 (2018)

Current constituency
- Created: 1984
- Party: Bangladesh Nationalist Party
- Member: Md. Abdul Aziz
- ← 60 Natore-3 62 Sirajganj-1 →

Natore-4 is a constituency represented in the Jatiya Sangsad (National Parliament) of Bangladesh since 2026 by Md. Abdul Aziz of the Bangladesh Nationalist Party.

== Boundaries ==
The constituency encompasses Baraigram and Gurudaspur.

== History ==
The constituency was created in 1984 from a Rajshahi constituency when the former Rajshahi District was split into four districts: Nawabganj, Naogaon, Rajshahi, and Natore.

== Members of Parliament ==
Election	Member	Party
1986	Md. Abul Kasem Sarker	Jatiya Party
1991	Abdul Quddus	Awami League
Feb 1996	Ekramul Alam	Bangladesh Nationalist Party
Jun 1996	Abdul Quddus	Awami League
2001	Mozammel Haque	Bangladesh Nationalist Party
2008	Abdul Quddus	Awami League
2023 by-election	Siddiqur Rahman Patwari	Awami League
2026	Md. Abdul Aziz	Bangladesh Nationalist Party

== Elections ==
=== Elections in the 2010s ===
General Election 2018: Natore-4
Party	Candidate	Votes	%	±%
AL	Abdul Quddus	285532	76.80	+2.1
BNP	Md Abdul Aziz	Boycotted Polls	N/A	N/A
JP(E)	MD ALA UDDIN MRIDHA	7304	1.98	+0.48
IAB	MD BADRUL AMIN	6371	1.72	+0.54
AL gain from JP(E)				

Abdul Quddus was re-elected unopposed in the 2014 general election after opposition parties withdrew their candidacies in a boycott of the election.

=== Elections in the 2000s ===
General Election 2008: Natore-4
Party	Candidate	Votes	%	±%
AL	Abdul Quddus	160,549	57.4	+23.2
BNP	Mozammel Haque	115,409	41.2	−6.8
IAB	Muhammad Abdul Latif Miau Helal	2,140	0.8	N/A
Zaker Party	Bimal Kumar Mitra	832	0.3	N/A
KSJL	Md. Shahidul Islam Munshi	311	0.1	N/A
United Citizen Movement	Md. Monjur Alam	265	0.1	N/A
CPB	Romnath Mahatho	259	0.1	N/A
PDP	A. M. Amrul Huq	59	0.0	N/A
Majority		45,140	16.1	+2.3
Turnout		279,824	93.1	+6.5
AL gain from BNP				

General Election 2001: Natore-4
Party	Candidate	Votes	%	±%
BNP	Mozammel Haque	111,626	48.0	+13.6
AL	Abdul Quddus	79,450	34.2	−3.4
Independent	Md. Eshrat Ali	31,333	13.5	N/A
IJOF	Abu Ahsan	10,006	4.3	N/A
Majority		32,176	13.8	+10.6
Turnout		232,415	86.6	+2.4
BNP gain from AL				

=== Elections in the 1990s ===
General Election June 1996: Natore-4
Party	Candidate	Votes	%	±%
AL	Abdul Quddus	67,013	37.6	+1.8
BNP	Mozammel Haque	61,378	34.4	+3.4
JP(E)	Md. Abul Kasem Sarker	35,414	19.9	+7.2
Jamaat	Md. Abdul Hai Sarker	12,736	7.1	−12.0
IOJ	Md. Abdul Latif Miah	1,005	0.6	N/A
Zaker Party	Saifuddaula Sabu	476	0.3	−0.3
Gano Forum	Abdul Haque Khan	263	0.1	N/A
Majority		5,635	3.2	−1.6
Turnout		178,285	84.2	+11.3
AL hold				

General Election 1991: Natore-4
Party	Candidate	Votes	%	±%
AL	Abdul Quddus	54,860	35.8	
BNP	Mozammel Haque	47,566	31.0	
Jamaat	Md. Abdul Hai Sarker	29,249	19.1	
JP(E)	Md. Abul Kasem Sarker	19,452	12.7	
Zaker Party	Md. Saifuddaula Sabu	876	0.6	
Jatiya Samajtantrik Dal-JSD	Abu Ahsan	603	0.4	
FP	Md. Meher Ali Biswas	406	0.3	
BAKSAL	M. A. Khalekh	339	0.2	
Majority		7,294	4.8	
Turnout		153,351	72.9	
AL gain from JP(E)				
