= Abdul Aziz (Natore politician) =

Bangladeshi politician

Md. Abdul Aziz
- মোঃ আব্দুল আজিজ

Member of the Bangladesh Parliament for Natore-4
- Incumbent
- Assumed office 17 February 2026
- Preceded by: Siddiqur Rahman Patwari

Personal details
- Born: 26 June 1959 (age 67) Dharabarisha, Gurudaspur Upazila, Natore District
- Party: Bangladesh Nationalist Party

Md Abdul Aziz is a Bangladeshi politician of the Bangladesh Nationalist Party. He is currently serving as a member of parliament from Natore-4.

== Early life ==
Aziz was born on 26 June 1959 in Gurudaspur Upazila in Natore District.

== Controversy ==
- In 14 October 2026, JCD leader was attacked in Gurudaspur, Natore who He died in 26 October in Dhaka. Aziz's son Nuruzzaman Mintu was arrested and placed on a three-day remand in connection with the murder of Shakil. Aziz announced Tk 20 lakh in financial assistance for the family of slain JCD leader Shakil Islam at his funeral prayers yesterday, prompting mourners to chant “Bhua”.
- In 28 October 2026, an intimate video featuring Aziz has circulated on social media, sparking widespread controversy and discussion. But he refused allegation and described it as a conspiracy to tarnish his political and social image, denying its authenticity and alleging that it was intended to discredit him.
