= Ruhul Quddus Talukdar =

Bangladeshi politician

Ruhul Quddus Talukder

Member of Parliament
- Incumbent
- Assumed office 17 February 2026
- Preceded by: Shafiqul Islam Shimul
- Constituency: Natore-2
- In office 12 June 1996 – 28 October 2006
- Preceded by: Shankar Gobind Chowdhury
- Succeeded by: Ahad Ali Sarker
- Constituency: Natore-2

Ministry of Land
- In office 2003–2006
- Prime Minister: Begum Khaleda Zia

Personal details
- Born: Natore, Bangladesh
- Party: Bangladesh Nationalist Party (BNP)
- Occupation: Politician
- Profession: Lawyer: Supreme Court Advocate

M Ruhul Quddus Talukder "Dulu" (born 7 September 1962) is a Bangladeshi politician, lawyer, former deputy minister, and member of parliament representing the Natore-2 constituency. He is the organising secretary of the Bangladesh Nationalist Party (BNP). Dulu was born in Natore Sadar Upazila, Natore District. He was a regular practitioner lawyer. Along with his legal career, he was also active in politics. In 1977, he joined the BNP's student organisation, Chhatra Dal.

== Career ==
Ruhul Quddus Talukder was a member of parliament (MP) for Natore-2 in 1996. He received 58,500 votes, while his nearest rival, Ahad Ali Sarker of the Awami League, received 50,455. He served on the Parliamentary Standing Committee in the Communications Ministry.

Dulu was re-elected to parliament from Natore-2 as a Bangladesh Nationalist Party candidate in 2001. He received 109,196 votes, while his nearest rival, Md. Hanif Ali Sheikh of the Awami League, received 84,498.

Dulu served as Deputy Minister for Land during the Bangladesh Nationalist Party-Bangladesh Jamaat-e-Islami government. During his term, he was accused of patronising Jagrata Muslim Janata, Bangladesh, an Islamist militant organisation. Dulu also maintained ties with and provided protection to Bangla Bhai, militant leader.

On 9 February 2005, Dulu's supporters attacked the district correspondent of the daily Janakantha, GM Iqbal Hasan, after he reported on arson attacks by Dulu's supporters on homes owned by Awami League activists.

Dulu was sued in February 2007 on allegations of misappropriation of government corrugated iron sheets.

A government commission formed to investigate the 2001 Bangladesh post-election violence found evidence of Dulu's in the violence against minorities and Awami League activists. It submitted its report in 2011.

The High Court declared BNP leaders Iqbal Hasan Mahmud Tuku and Ruhul Quddus Talukder Dulu to participate in the 11th parliamentary election after the EC rejected the appeals and approved the return to parliament.

The Bangladesh High Court cleared the way for this BNP leader, Dulu, to contest in the 2018 election. It directed the Bangladesh Election Commission to accept his nominations and stayed the previous rejection order of the returning officers. He is the organising secretary of the Bangladesh Nationalist Party. He is the organizing secretary of the Bangladesh Nationalist Party. He was arrested on 18 December. The Joint Secretary General of the Bangladesh Nationalist Party, Ruhul Kabir Rizvi, condemned his arrest and accused the government of interfering with the Bangladesh Nationalist Party's participation in the general election on 30 December 2018. His bail application was rejected on 12 February 2019.

Dulu posted bail on a sabotage case on 2 September 2019.

On 15 August 2024, Dulu issued a threat, stating that any TV channels or newspapers that continue to feature images of Sheikh Hasina, whom he labeled as the "murderer" of hundreds of students and people, would be set on fire. Dulu made these remarks during a sit-in protest held in front of the district BNP office in Alaipur, Natore. He further claimed that, for the past 15 years, under government orders, media outlets were prohibited from broadcasting or publishing images and speeches of BNP's Acting Chairman, Tarique Rahman, accusing the media of being aligned with the Awami League.
