= Ekramul Alam =

Bangladeshi politician

- একরামুল আলম

Member of Parliament for Natore-4
- In office 15 February 1996 – 12 June 1996
- Preceded by: Md. Abdul Quddus
- Succeeded by: Md. Abdul Quddus

Personal details
- Born: Natore District
- Died: 27 December 2015 (aged 65) Bonpara Bazar, Natore District, Bangladesh
- Party: Bangladesh Nationalist Party

Ekramul Alam was a politician of Natore District of Bangladesh and a member of parliament for the Natore-4 constituency in February 1996.

== Political life ==
Ekramul Alam was the principal of Bonpara Degree College from its inception. He was the principal of Baraigram Degree College. He was the chairman of Baraigram Upazila. He was president of the Baraigram Upazila unit of the Bangladesh Nationalist Party (BNP). He was elected to parliament from Natore-4 as a BNP candidate in the 15 February 1996 Bangladeshi general election.

== Death ==
Ekramul Alam died on 27 December 2015 in Bonpara Bazar, Natore District, aged 65.
