= North Bengal Sugar Mills =

Sugar Mill Institution

- Abbreviation: NBSM
- Formation: 1933
- Type: Sugar mill
- Legal status: State-owned
- Headquarters: Natore District, Bangladesh
- Region served: Bangladesh
- Official language: Bengali
- Managing Director: Md Humayun Kabir
- Parent organization: Bangladesh Sugar and Food Industries Corporation

North Bengal Sugar Mills (Bengali: নর্থ বেঙ্গল চিনি কল লিমিটেড) is a Bangladeshi state owned sugar mill corporation located in Sadar Gopalpur, Lalpur Upazila, Natore District. Md Humayun Kabir is the managing director of the North Bengal Sugar Mills.

== History ==
North Bengal Sugar Mills was established in 1933 by the Messrs Surujmal and Nagrumal during the British Raj. The mill produced bagasse, molasses, and Sugarcane press mud. In 1965, the government of Pakistan nationalized the mill.

During the Bangladesh War of Independence in 1971, the Pakistan Army killed 150 staff of the mill including administrator Lieutenant M Anwarul Azim. This was in revenge for a Mukti Bahini ambush on the Pakistan Army at the Gopalpur railway station, later renamed Azim Nagar. The bodies were dumped in a pond at the mill which was later renamed to Shaheed Sagar (martyr sea). Azim was awarded the Independence Award, the highest civilian award of Bangladesh. The incident is called the Gopalpur massacre and commemorated every year.

In February 2008, the government stopped production at the mill amidst rising price of sugar.

North Bengal Sugar Mills suspended production in 2010 while facing mounting losses. It lost 120 million BDT that year while missing production target due to low yields.

The mill stopped production in February 2012 due to shortage of raw material. Workers of the mill went on strike demanding the mill implement the wages recommended by the National Wages and Productivity Commission.

The mill owns 22,729 hectares of farm land and 1.62 billion BDT in assets. In 2014, the mill started a project to develop its facilities to produce refined sugar and electricity at the same time. The project was supposed to be completed in December 2016. Its deadline was extended to June 2021 but the Project Evaluation Committee stopped it in January 2021 and ordered a new survey. Bangladesh Planning Commission blamed the cancellation on poor planning and implementation of Bangladesh Sugar and Food Industries Corporation.

By 2020, North Bengal Sugar Mills along with Natore Sugar Mills were the only state-owned sugars still in production.

The mill purchased 48,000 tons of sugarcane in 2021 short of 71,000 ton target. The recovery rate/yield was below seven percent. The mill had difficulty sourcing sugarcanes as farmers were selling to illegal crusher plants which offered a higher price for the sugarcanes. Six sugar mills were closed across the country as they were struggling with similar issues. Pabna Sugar Mill supplies sugarcane to North Bengal Sugar Mills.

In January 2022, the managing director of North Bengal Sugar Mills, Md Humayun Kabi, stated productivity at the mill was down due to aging machinery due to which resulted in losses for the mill. It made 861.7 million BDT in losses in the 2019-2020 fiscal year. The company indicated that it wanted to produce alcohol like state owned Carew & Co (Bangladesh) Ltd.

The Mill stopped production in March 2024 after producing nearly 11 thousand tons of sugar for the season.
