= Natore Government Boys High School =

Secondary school in Natore District, Bangladesh

Coordinates: 24°24′38″N 88°58′57″E

Natore Government Boys' High School is a secondary school in Natore Sadar Upazila of Natore District. It was established in 1910 as Madrasa-e-Anjumania. After the Partition of India in 1947, it was renamed Jinnah Model High School. On 1 May 1968 it was nationalized, becoming Jinnah Government Model High School. After Bangladesh won its independence, the school was renamed Natore Government High School.
