= Shefali Momtaz =

Bangladeshi politician

- শেফালী মমতাজ

Member of the Bangladesh Parliament for Reserved Women's Seat-24
- In office 19 March 2009 – 24 January 2014
- Preceded by: Shahana Rahman Rani
- Succeeded by: Sanjida Khanam

Personal details
- Party: Bangladesh Awami League
- Spouse: Momtaz Uddin

Shefali Momtaz is a Bangladesh Awami League politician and a former Jatiya Sangsad member from the reserved seat-24 during 2009–2014. Her husband, Momtaz Uddin, was a Jatiya Sangsad member from Natore-1.

== Career ==
Momtaz was elected to parliament from reserved seat as a Bangladesh Awami League candidate in 2009.
