= Md. Abul Kalam =

Bangladeshi politician

Member of the Bangladesh Parliament for Natore-1
- In office 10 January 2024 – 6 August 2024
- Preceded by: Shahidul Islam Bakul
- Succeeded by: Farzana Sharmin
- In office 29 January 2014 – 28 January 2019
- Preceded by: Abu Talha
- Succeeded by: Shahidul Islam Bakul

Personal details
- Born: 25 July 1956 (age 70)
- Party: Bangladesh Awami League

Md. Abul Kalam (Bengali: মোঃ আবুল কালাম) is a Bangladesh Awami League politician and a former Jatiya Sangsad member representing the Natore-1 constituency.

== Early life ==
Abul Kalam was born on 25 July 1956. He has a B.A., M.A., and LLB degree.

== Career ==
Abul Kalam was elected to Parliament from Natore-1 on 5 January 2014 as a Bangladesh Awami League candidate. He was elected again in the 2024 Bangladeshi general election as an independent candidate.
