= Momtaz Uddin =

Bangladeshi politician

- মমতাজ উদ্দিন

Member of the Bangladesh Parliament for Natore-1
- In office 10 July 1986 – 6 December 1987
- Preceded by: Position established
- Succeeded by: Md. Naosher Ali Sarkar

Personal details
- Born: 21 September 1946 Abdulpur, Natore, Bengal Presidency
- Died: June 6, 2003 (aged 56) Natore, Bangladesh
- Party: Bangladesh Awami League
- Spouse: Shefali Momtaz

Momtaz Uddin (21 September 1946 – 6 June 2003) was a Bangladesh Awami League politician who served as a member of the Jatiya Sangsad representing the Natore-1 constituency. He was the senior vice president of the district Awami League. He was a member of Mukti Bahini in the Bangladesh Liberation war in 1971, commander in chief of Lalpur.

== Early life and education ==
Momtaz Uddin was born on 21 September 1946 to a Bengali family of Muslim Pramaniks in the Milkipara of Abdulpur village in Lalpur, Natore, then part of the Rajshahi district of the Bengal Presidency. He studied at the Karimpur High School up until class 8. He received his Secondary School Certificate from the Chowk Nazirpur High School in 1966 and his Higher Secondary Certificate from the Nawab Siraj-Ud-Dowla Government College, Natore in 1968. He graduated with a Bachelor's degree from Ishwardi College in 1970.

He is married to politician Shefali Momtaz. His son, Shamim Ahmad Sagore, is the general secretary of Lalpur Awami League.

== Assassination ==
On 6 June 2003, local Natore police stated that a band of 10 armed men interrupted Uddin's motorcycle at Darpara on the Goapalpur-Abdulpur Road in Natore and stabbed him to death.

On 13 March 2013, a speedy trial tribunal in Rajshahi sentenced nine people to life in prison for killing Uddin.
