= Siddiqur Rahman Patwari =

Bangladeshi politician

- সিদ্দিকুর রহমান পাটোয়ারী

Member of the Bangladesh Parliament for Natore-4
- In office 30 January 2024 – 6 August 2024
- Preceded by: Md. Abdul Quddus
- Succeeded by: Abdul Aziz

Personal details
- Born: 6 March 1961 (age 65)
- Party: Awami League

Siddiqur Rahman Patwari (born 6 March 1961) is a Bangladeshi politician from the Awami League. He is from Natore District and is a former member of the Jatiya Sangsad representing the Natore-4 constituency. Before being elected uncontested as an MP, he served as upazila chairman of Baraigram.

== Political life ==
On 16 September 2023, the Awami League nominated Siddiqur Rahman Patwari to contest the Natore-4 constituency by-election scheduled for 11 October. He is also serving as Natore District Awami League health and population secretary. He was formally pronounced the winner of the by-polls on 24 September 2023.

He was re-elected in the 2024 Bangladeshi general election.
