= Md. Naosher Ali Sarkar =

Bangladeshi politician

Member of Bangladesh Parliament
- In office 1988–1991
- Preceded by: Momtaz Uddin
- Succeeded by: Fazlur Rahman Patal

Personal details
- Born: 2 January 1949 Natore District
- Died: 8 April 2015 (aged 66) Natore District
- Party: Bangladesh Nationalist Party
- Other political affiliations: Jatiya Party (Ershad)

Md. Naosher Ali Sarkar (2 January 1949 – 8 April 2015) was a Bangladesh Nationalist Party politician and a former member of parliament for Natore-1.

== Birth and early life ==
Naosher Ali Sarkar was born on 2 January 1949 in Natore District.

== Career ==
Sarkar took active part in the war of liberation in 1971. He was the chairman of Panka Union from 1972 to 1986. He was elected chairman of Bagatipara upazila from 2009 to 2014. He was elected to parliament from Natore-1 as a Jatiya Party candidate in 1988. He joined the Bangladesh Nationalist Party in 1996 and was elected vice-president of Natore district BNP.

== Death ==
Sarkar died on 8 April 2015.
