= Shyampur Sugar Mills =

Coordinates: 25.694766°N 89.144120°E

Shyampur Sugar Mills Ltd.
- Native name: Shyampur Sugar Mills
- Company type: Government
- Founded: 1965; 61 years ago
- Headquarters: Shyampur, Badarganj, Rangpur, Bangladesh
- Area served: Worldwide
- Products: Sugar, Organic fertilizer
- Owner: Bangladesh Sugar and Food Industries Corporation

Shyampur Sugar Mills a Bangladesh sugar mill. It was established in 1967 by the Pakistani government. At that time East Pakistan had only 5 sugar mills. It is situated at Shyampur under Badarganj Upazila, 16 kilometers west of Rangpur City. Shyampur Sugar Mills falls under the Bangladesh Sugar and Food Industries Corporation. The mill has over 1,400 workers. The livelihood of the people of the region depends largely on this industry.
