= Abu Talha (politician) =

Bangladeshi politician

Member of Parliament for Natore-1
- In office 25 January 2009 – 24 January 2014
- Preceded by: Fazlur Rahman Potol
- Succeeded by: Md. Abul Kalam

Personal details
- Born: 30 October 1939 (age 86)
- Party: Jatiya Party (Ershad)

Abu Talha (born 30 October 1939) is a Jatiya Party (Ershad) politician and a former member of parliament for Natore-1.

== Career ==
Talha was elected to parliament from Natore-1 as a Jatiya Party candidate in 2008. He is the vice-chairman of the Jatiya Party. In 2017, the Anti-Corruption Commission sued him for evading 18 million taka in taxes.
