= Farzana Sharmin =

Bangladeshi lawyer and politician

- ফারজানা শারমিন
- Sharmin in 2026

Minister of State for Social Welfare
- Incumbent
- Assumed office 17 February 2026
- Prime Minister: Tarique Rahman
- Preceded by: Ashraf Ali Khan Khasru

Member of Parliament
- Incumbent
- Assumed office 17 February 2026
- Preceded by: Md. Abul Kalam
- Constituency: Natore-1

Personal details
- Born: 2 November 1984 (age 41) Natore, Bangladesh
- Party: Bangladesh Nationalist Party
- Spouse: H M Barru Sani
- Children: 2
- Parent: Fazlur Rahman Potol (father)
- Education: University of Dhaka (MA); BPP University (MA)
- Occupation: Lawyer, politician
- Nickname: Putul

Farzana Sharmin Putul (born 2 November 1984) is a Bangladeshi barrister and Bangladesh Nationalist Party politician. She is the incumbent member of Jatiya Sangsad representing the Natore-1 constituency and the incumbent Minister of State for Social Welfare since February 2026.

Sharmin was a member of the Anti Corruption Commission reform commission of the Muhammad Yunus led interim government during 2024–2026. She has been practicing law at the Supreme Court of Bangladesh. As a member of Bangladesh Nationalist Party, she served on its Foreign Affairs Advisory Committee, Human Rights Committee, and Media Cell Committee.

== Early life and education ==
Sharmin was born in Bangladesh on 2 November 1984. Her father, Fazlur Rahman Potol, was a State Minister for Youth, Sports, and Communications and a four-time elected Jatiya Sangsad member representing the Natore-1 constituency.

Sharmin pursued legal studies at the University of Dhaka and the University of London, earning undergraduate law degrees from both institutions. She further obtained two master's degrees in law, one from the University of Dhaka and another from BPP University College in London.

== Career ==
Sharmin began her legal career in 2008 as an advocate at the District Court of Bangladesh. In 2012, she was admitted to practice at the Supreme Court of Bangladesh. She has built expertise in criminal litigation, judicial review, and constitutional law. She has worked as an associate at the legal firm 'Barrister Moudud Ahmed and Associates' and is currently a partner at RIGHTS Chambers. Additionally, she has served as a legal advisor to various banks, insurance companies, and private enterprises. She is a lawyer of the Bangladesh Telecommunication Regulatory Commission.

Sharmin is listed as an English-speaking lawyer with the British High Commission's retained list in Dhaka. She is a member of several legal organizations, including the International Bar Association, the Society of the Middle Temple (England), the Asian Society of International Law (AsiaSIL), and the Dhaka Bar Association.

Sharmin is actively engaged in Bangladesh Nationalist Party (BNP) politics. She serves as a member of the special assistant to the BNP Chairperson's Foreign Affairs Advisory Committee. Additionally, she contributes to BNP's Human Rights Committee and Media Cell Committee. In 2023, she was a director of Lysander Tech Limited, based in the United Kingdom.

After the fall of the Sheikh Hasina led Awami League government in August 2024, Sharmin was made a member of the Anti-Corruption Commission Reform Commission of the Muhammad Yunus led interim government. She has represented Mirza Fakhrul Islam Alamgir, general secretary of the Bangladesh Nationalist Party, in his challenge of the 15th amendment to the Constitution of Bangladesh.

Sharmin won the 2026 Bangladeshi general election contesting at the Natore-1 constituency securing 102,726 votes while his nearest opponent Bangladesh Jamaat-e-Islami candidate Abul Kalam Azad got 90,568 votes.

== Personal life ==
Sharmin is married to H M Barru Sani; they have had two children together.
