= Carew & Co =

Sugar Refining Mill

Carew & Co (Bangladesh) Ltd.

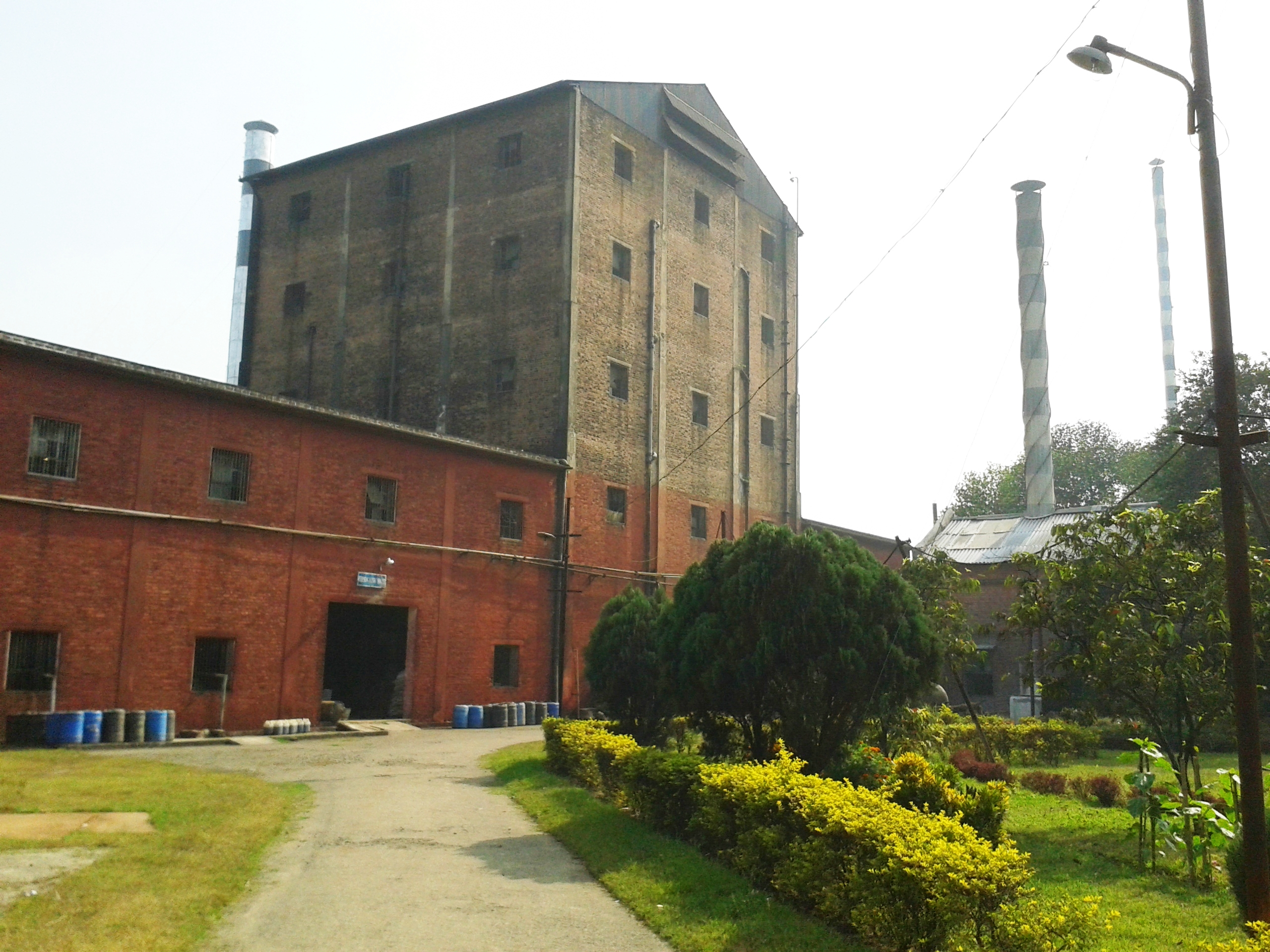
- Formation: 1938
- Headquarters: Darshana, Khulna, Bangladesh
- Region served: Bangladesh
- Official language: Bengali
- Parent organization: Bangladesh Sugar and Food Industries Corporation

Carew & Co (Bangladesh) Ltd. is the first ever licensed distillery producing alcohol made from sugar molasses in Bangladesh and is located at Darshana, Chuadanga, Khulna Division, Bangladesh. It operates the country's only government-owned licensed distillery, which produces alcoholic beverages from sugarcane molasses.

The distillery manufactures several types of liquor, including whisky, rum, brandy, gin, and vodka. Established in 1938 in its present form, the company operates a sugar mill alongside its distillery. Its other business activities include bio-fertiliser production, commercial farming, and pharmaceutical manufacturing.

It is located inside Darsana Sugar Mills compound and is under the authority of Bangladesh Sugar and Food Industries Corporation. It is one of the 15 sugar mills owned by Bangladesh Sugar and Food Industries Corporation that makes a profit.

== History ==
Carew & Co. (Bangladesh) Ltd. traces its origins to a distillery established in 1803 by British businessman John Maxwell in Kanpur, Uttar Pradesh, in British India. The distillery was established near Kanpur to supply rum to British troops. The establishment is described as the first distillery in the Indian subcontinent. The distillery became commercially successful and began generating profits for Maxwell. He subsequently employed Robert Russell Carew, a specialist in spirits production. Impressed by the distillery's operations and prospects, Carew acquired the business in partnership with two other investors. He was also a director of Rohilkund and Kumaon Railway Company Limited and City of London Real Property Company Limited. He later appointed his younger brother as the factory's manager. His brother was killed during the Indian Rebellion of 1857.

Following the Indian Rebellion of 1857, Robert Russell Carew reopened the distillery with the support of the British Army. In 1897, the business was incorporated as a joint-stock company. Under Carew's management, the company expanded its operations by establishing branches in Asansol, Katni, and Darsana, then part of East Bengal. The machinery and equipment used in the company's factories were manufactured in Glasgow, Scotland. The Indian operations of Carew & Co. were purchased Vittal Mallya in 1965.

Following the Bangladesh Liberation War, East Pakistan became the independent state of Bangladesh in 1971. In 1973, the government of Bangladesh nationalised the distillery at Darsana, which subsequently became known as Carew & Co. (Bangladesh) Ltd.

Carew & Co. is a government-owned, revenue-generating enterprise that contributes to public revenue through tax payments. The distillery premises are enclosed by a 20-foot-high security wall and are equipped with security measures. The company produces two broad categories of alcoholic beverages: domestic products manufactured using indigenous recipes and foreign-style products based on non-indigenous formulations. Its distribution network comprises approximately 200 general distribution agents and 13 agents specialising in country liquor.

In 2012, the government of Bangladesh launched a modernisation project for Carew & Co. to upgrade its sugar production facilities. The project was initially scheduled for completion in 2014, with an estimated cost of BDT 465.7 million. However, repeated delays increased the projected cost to more than BDT 1.02 billion. The project aimed to improve production capacity, reduce processing losses, and modernise the factory's machinery. It also planned to expand its distribution network by opening additional sales centres and warehouses across Bangladesh.

During the 2024–2025 financial year, Carew & Co. recorded a profit of approximately US$10 million, while its tax contribution to the government amounted to a comparable sum. These figures were reported by the company's managing director, Rabbik Hasan, who described the financial results as the highest in the company's history. In the 2025–2026 financial year, Carew & Co.'s distillery division recorded a pre-tax profit of BDT 2.24 billion, while liquor sales reached approximately BDT 4.90 billion, representing a 10% increase from the previous financial year. The company's growth was attributed partly to increased demand for locally produced alcohol following government restrictions on foreign liquor imports in 2021, according to The Business Standard. In the 2025–2026 financial year, Carew & Co. projected a net profit of approximately BDT 1.65 billion. The distillery was the company's main source of income, with an expected profit of BDT 2.24 billion. The sugar factory was projected to incur a loss of approximately BDT 600 million.

Carew & Co. has faced allegations of theft and financial irregularities at its Darshana facility. In 2024, several incidents were reported, including the attempted theft of foreign liquor and the alleged disappearance of approximately 13,000 litres of industrial spirit. Investigations also raised concerns about irregularities in the recruitment of 104 permanent workers. The company formed investigation committees and took disciplinary action against some employees.

The company operates within Bangladesh's regulated alcoholic beverage industry, where the purchase and consumption of alcohol are subject to government restrictions and permit requirements. Its Darsana facility supplies domestically manufactured alcoholic beverages to eligible consumers. Beyond its distillery operations, the company's industrial activities include sugar production and the manufacture of products such as fertiliser, vinegar, and industrial alcohol. The company also operates bio-fertiliser, commercial farming, and pharmaceutical units.

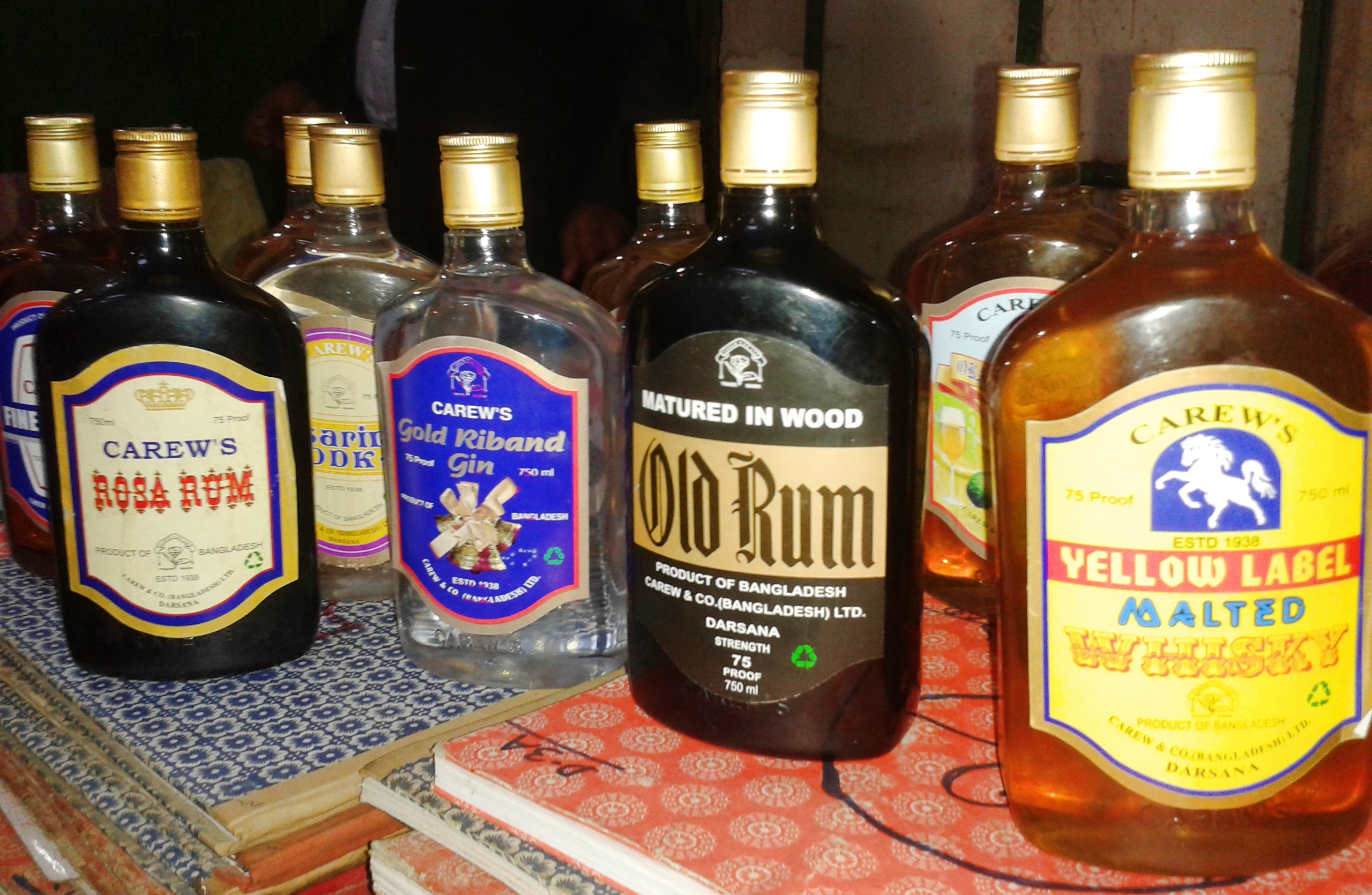
Products of Darsana Distillery

== Products ==
The distillery manufactures several alcoholic beverage brands, including Imperial Whisky and Tsarina Vodka. Its vodka production uses sugarcane-based alcohol and flavouring ingredients sourced from the Netherlands.

- Fine Brandy
- Cherry Brandy
- Yellow Label Malted Whiskey
- Imperial Whiskey
- Old Rum
- Rosa Rum
- Gold Ribbon Gin
- Orange Curaçao
- Tsarina Vodka
