= Pramanik =

Pramanik or Pramanick is a Bangladeshi and Indian surname. Notable people with this name include:

== Pramanik ==
- Emaz Uddin Pramanik (born 1941), Bangladeshi politician
- Momtaz Uddin Pramanik (1946–2023), Bangladeshi politician
- Bhaskar Pramanik (born 1951), Indian businessman
- Shamsul Alam Pramanik (1953–2023), Bangladeshi politician
- Siddique ul-Islam Pramanik (1970–2007), Bangladeshi criminal
- Santanu Pramanik (born 1985), Indian politician
- Nisith Pramanik (born 1986), Indian politician
- Pinki Pramanik (born 1986), Indian sprinter
- Pradipta Pramanik (born 1998), Indian cricketer
- Hafizur Rahman Pramanik, Bangladeshi politician
- Malabika Pramanik, Canadian mathematician
- Manoj Pramanik, Bangladeshi actor

== Pramanick ==
- Diptendu Pramanick (1910–1989), Indian film personality
- Radhika Ranjan Pramanick (1932–2020), Indian politician
- Sudhamoy Pramanick (1884–1974), Indian social activist
