= Natore-1 =

Constituency of Bangladesh's Jatiya Sangsad

Coordinates: 24.18°N 88.96°E

- Constituency for the Jatiya Sangsad
- District: Natore District
- Division: Rajshahi Division
- Electorate: 311,925 (2018)

Current constituency
- Created: 1984
- Party: Bangladesh Nationalist Party
- Member: Farzana Sharmin
- ← 57 Rajshahi-6 59 Natore-2 →

Natore-1 is a constituency represented in the Jatiya Sangsad (National Parliament) of Bangladesh since 2026 by Farzana Sharmin of the Bangladesh Nationalist Party.

== Boundaries ==
The constituency encompasses Bagatipara and Lalpur upazilas.

== History ==
The constituency was created in 1984 from a Rajshahi constituency when the former Rajshahi District was split into four districts: Nawabganj, Naogaon, Rajshahi, and Natore.

== Members of Parliament ==
| Election | Member | Party |
|---|---|---|
| 1986 | Momtaz Uddin | Awami League |
| 1988 | Md. Naosher Ali Sarkar | Independent |
| 1991 | Fazlur Rahman Patal | Bangladesh Nationalist Party |
| Jun 1996 | Fazlur Rahman Potol | Bangladesh Nationalist Party |
| 2001 | Fazlur Rahman Potol | Bangladesh Nationalist Party |
| 2008 | Abu Talha | Jatiya Party (Ershad) |
| 2014 | Abul Kalam Azad | Awami League |
| 2018 | Shahidul Islam Bakul | Awami League |
| 2024 | Md. Abul Kalam | Independent |
| 2026 | Farzana Sharmin | Bangladesh Nationalist Party |

== Elections ==
=== Elections in the 2010s ===
Abul Kalam Azad was elected unopposed in the 2014 general election after opposition parties withdrew their candidacies in a boycott of the election.

=== Elections in the 2000s ===
General Election 2008: Natore-1
| Party | Candidate | Votes | % | ±% |
|---|---|---|---|---|
| JP(E) | Abu Talha | 123,835 | 53.4 | N/A |
| BNP | Fazlur Rahman Patal | 103,814 | 44.8 | −6.4 |
| PDP | Md. Pervez Kabir | 3,377 | 1.5 | N/A |
| IAB | Md. Mazaammel Hossain | 657 | 0.3 | N/A |
| CPB (M-L) | Birendra Nath Saha | 297 | 0.1 | N/A |
| Majority | | 20,021 | 8.6 | +3.6 |
| Turnout | | 231,980 | 92.3 | +4.4 |
| JP(E) gain from BNP | | | | |

General Election 2001: Natore-1
| Party | Candidate | Votes | % | ±% |
|---|---|---|---|---|
| BNP | Fazlur Rahman Patal | 99,591 | 51.2 | +2.3 |
| AL | Momtaz Uddin | 89,948 | 46.2 | +7.6 |
| IJOF | Md. Ashraful Alam Khan | 2,911 | 1.5 | N/A |
| WPB | Ansar Ali Dulal | 2,027 | 1.0 | −0.4 |
| JSD | Syed Shamsuzzoha | 180 | 0.1 | N/A |
| Majority | | 9,643 | 5.0 | −5.4 |
| Turnout | | 194,657 | 87.9 | −2.2 |
| BNP hold | | | | |

=== Elections in the 1990s ===
General Election June 1996: Natore-1
| Party | Candidate | Votes | % | ±% |
|---|---|---|---|---|
| BNP | Fazlur Rahman Patal | 78,897 | 48.9 | −2.4 |
| AL | Momtaz Uddin | 62,184 | 38.6 | +9.4 |
| Jatiya Samajtantrik Dal (Mahiuddin) | Md. Tasnim Alam | 11,433 | 7.1 | N/A |
| JP(E) | Md. Moniruzzaman | 3,937 | 2.4 | −3.0 |
| WPB | Ansar Ali Dulal | 2,219 | 1.4 | N/A |
| Independent | Abu Talha | 2,095 | 1.3 | N/A |
| Zaker Party | Md. Zillur Rahman Khan | 276 | 0.2 | +0.1 |
| Zaker Party | Md. Abdul Bari Sarkar | 166 | 0.1 | 0.0 |
| Majority | | 16,713 | 10.4 | −11.7 |
| Turnout | | 161,207 | 90.1 | +11.5 |
| BNP hold | | | | |

General Election 1991: Natore-1
| Party | Candidate | Votes | % | ±% |
|---|---|---|---|---|
| BNP | Fazlur Rahman Patal | 70,646 | 51.3 | |
| AL | Momtaz Uddin | 40,264 | 29.2 | |
| Jamaat | Md. Tasneem Al Faruk | 19,114 | 13.9 | |
| JP(E) | Md. Naosher Ali Sarkar | 7,486 | 5.4 | |
| Zaker Party | Md. Hatem Ali Mondol | 122 | 0.1 | |
| Bangladesh Muslim League (Kader) | Md. Abdus Samad Khanpuri | 80 | 0.1 | |
| Majority | | 30,382 | 22.1 | |
| Turnout | | 137,712 | 78.6 | |
| BNP gain from JP(E) | | | | |
