= Shankar Gobind Chowdhury =

Bangladeshi politician

Member of Bangladesh Parliament
- Preceded by: Mohammad Mujibur Rahman
- Succeeded by: Ruhul Quddus Talukdar

Personal details
- Party: Bangladesh Awami League

Shankar Gobind Chowdhury (died 1997) was a Bangladesh Awami League politician and member of parliament for Natore-2. He was an organizer of the Liberation War of Bangladesh.

== Career ==
Chowdhury was elected a member of the Pakistan National Assembly in the 1970 elections as a candidate of Awami League. He was also a member of the Constituent Assembly of Bangladesh in 1972. When BAKSAL was introduced in 1975, he was appointed governor of Natore District.

Chowdhury was elected to parliament from Natore-2 as a Bangladesh Awami League candidate in 1991.

== Death and legacy ==
Chowdhury died on 13 September 1997.

The Bangladesh government posthumously awarded Chowdhury the Independence Day Award in 2018. In November 1991, Prime Minister Khaleda Zia laid the foundation of Natore Stadium. Construction began in 1996 and was completed in 18 months. On 12 January 1999, it was inaugurated by Prime Minister Sheikh Hasina as Shankar Govinda Chowdhury Stadium.
