= Fazlur Rahman Potol =

Bangladeshi politician

- ফজলুর রহমান পটল

Minister of State for Youth and Sports
- In office 11 October 2001 – 19 October 2006
- Prime Minister: Khaleda Zia
- Preceded by: Obaidul Quader
- Succeeded by: Ahad Ali Sarker

Member of Parliament
- In office 5 March 1991 – 27 October 2006
- Preceded by: Md. Naosher Ali Sarkar
- Succeeded by: Abu Talha
- Constituency: Natore-1

Personal details
- Died: 11 August 2016 (aged 65) Kolkata, India
- Children: Farzana Sharmin

Fazlur Rahman Potol (died 11 August 2016) was a Bangladeshi politician. He served as a State Minister for Youth, Sports, and Communications during 2001–2006 and a four-time elected Jatiya Sangsad member representing the Natore-1 constituency during 1991–2006.

On 11 August 2016, Potol died at Rabindranath Tagore International Institute of Cardiac Sciences in West Bengal of India.

== Personal life ==
Potol had a daughter, Farzana Sharmin, a lawyer and a politician.
