= Ahad Ali Sarker =

Bangladeshi politician (born 1952)

State Minister for Youth and Sports
- In office 6 January 2009 – 21 November 2013
- Preceded by: Fazlur Rahman Potol
- Succeeded by: Mujibul Haque

Member of the Bangladesh Parliament for Natore-2
- In office 25 January 2009 – 24 January 2014
- Preceded by: Ruhul Quddus Talukdar
- Succeeded by: Shafiqul Islam Shimul

Personal details
- Born: 3 January 1952 (age 74)
- Party: Bangladesh Awami League

Ahad Ali Sarker (born 3 January 1952) is a Bangladesh Awami League politician and a former state minister of youth and sports during 2009–2013.

== Early life ==
Ahad was born on 3 January 1952. He has a B.A. degree.

== Career ==
Ahad was elected to parliament in 2008 from Natore-2 as a Bangladesh Awami League candidate. He is the vice-president of the Natore Awami League unit. In February 2016, his home in Natore was attacked by activists of the Jubo League. On 9 July 2019, his rally was attacked by Jubo League activists.
