= Md. Abul Kasem Sarker =

Bangladeshi politician

Member of Bangladesh Parliament

Personal details
- Party: Jatiya Party (Ershad)

Md. Abul Kasem Sarker is a Jatiya Party (Ershad) politician and a former member of parliament for Natore-4.

== Career ==
Sarker was elected to parliament from Natore-4 as a Jatiya Party candidate in 1986 and 1988.
