= Gopalpur massacre =

Mass killings

The Gopalpur massacre (Bengali: গোপালপুর গণহত্যা) was a massacre of 195 people committed by the Pakistan Army during the Bangladesh War of Independence of 1971. The killing took place at Gopalpur municipality of Lalpur Upazila, Natore on 5 May 1971. The victims of the massacre were the Bengali employees of the North Bengal Sugar Mill.

== Background ==
At midnight of 25 March 1971, the Pakistan army launched Operation Searchlight, an operation against Bengali nationalism of the then East Pakistan. This attack triggered a war and commenced atrocities that continued for nine months until the end of the war.

Elements of Pakistan army established control over Dhaka city on the night of 25 March. But they faced stubborn resistance from locally organized Bengali armed forces in other parts of the country. In Pabna, The 25 Punjab regiment of the Pakistan army suffered heavy casualties as they tried to wrest control of the city from the locals. They called for reinforcements from the battalion headquarters in Rajshahi. Major Raja Aslam arrived in Pabna with the reinforcement but was forced to retreat toward Rajshahi but their movement was hampered by occasional clashes with local forces. The locals also put up barricades and destroyed a bridge at Dhanaidah in Natore to stall the movement. A railway wagon barricade was put up at Gopalpur rail gate by the local stationmaster.

On 30 March, as the army halted near the Waliar Moyna village, it was attacked by a group of Bengali fighters aided by the local Santals. In the ensuing battle (remembered as Moynar Juddho, the battle of Moyna by the locals) 40 of the Bengali fighters died. The casualty rate on the Pakistani side was lower, but their morale dropped significantly. In the night, the Pakistanis attempted to flee the area in small groups. The following day, several of them were captured by the locals, including the commanding officer Major Aslam. The soldiers were taken to the residence of Lt. Anwarul Azim, the leader of the local Bengali force and the general manager of North Bengal Sugar Mill. After a summary trial at Lalpur SS Pilot High School ground, the Pakistan army men were shot dead.

== Massacre ==
In response to the Bengali resistance, the Pakistan army headquarters at Rajshahi dispatched forces by land and by air. The army quickly took control of Pabna, Ishwardi and Natore. On 5 May, around 10 am, the army reached Gopalpur and captured the sugar mill, a Bengali stronghold. Around 200 Bengali people, most of which were the employees of the mill, were rounded up and interrogated about the whereabouts of the fighters. Monjur Iman, a non-Bengali worker of the mill, was assisting the soldiers in identifying the Bengalis. The leader of the fighters, Lt. Anwarul Azim, handed himself over to the army and requested to let the people go. The soldiers shot down Lt. Azim. Then the captives were lined up by the pond inside the sugar mill with 13 machine guns pointed at them and were gunned down. Only five out of the 200 captives: Abdul Jalil Sikdar, Khorshed Alam, Abul Hossain, Emaduddin and Injil Uddin Ahmed survived the carnage.

All the bodies were dumped into the pond. The soldiers searched for survivors and ensured death by charging bayonets on the bodies. One administrative officer of the mill survived the shooting but, when found alive, was flogged to death.

After the war, the pond was named Shaheed Sagar (The sea of martyrs). Gopalpur Railway Station was renamed Azim Nagar Station in memory of Lt. Azim.

== See also ==
- List of massacres in Bangladesh
- 1971 Bangladesh atrocities
- Chuknagar massacre
