= M Anwarul Azim =

Bengali industrial administrator

- Born: 13 December 1931; Raninagar, Bengal, British India
- Died: 5 May 1971 (aged 39); Lalpur, Rajshahi, Bangladesh
- Awards: Independence Day Award (2018)

M Anwarul Azim (13 December 1931 – 5 May 1971) was a Bengali industrial administrator who was killed in the Bangladesh Liberation war. He was awarded Independence Day Award in 2018 posthumously by the Government of Bangladesh.

== Early life ==
Anwarul Azim was born in Raninagar, Naogoan, East Bengal, British India on 13 December 1931. He graduated from Dinajpur Government Zila School in 1949 and from Surendranath College in 1951. He opened a library named 'Shakti Pathagar' in Dinajpur town. He graduated from Rajshahi College in 1953 with a BA. He finished MA in international relations and LLB from University of Dhaka.

== Career ==
Anwarul Azim joined the Narayanganj employment exchange as a manager. He then joined the East Pakistan Industrial Development Corporation, working in various facilities of the corporation. He served in Latif Bawani Jute Mill as the labor officer. In 1965, he received further training from the University of Michigan. He then joined Narayanganj Dockyard where he served as senior administrator. He had joined the Pakistan Army Commission promoted to Lieutenant. He then joined North Bengal Sugar Mill as general manager.

=== Bangladesh Liberation war ===
Anwarul Azim helped members of the Mukti Bahini during the Bangladesh Liberation war. He led the Mukti Bahini in the fight against Pakistan Army near Gopalpur Railway station. He helped them capture and kill Pakistan Army Major, Raja Aslam. The incident became known as Gopalpur massacre.

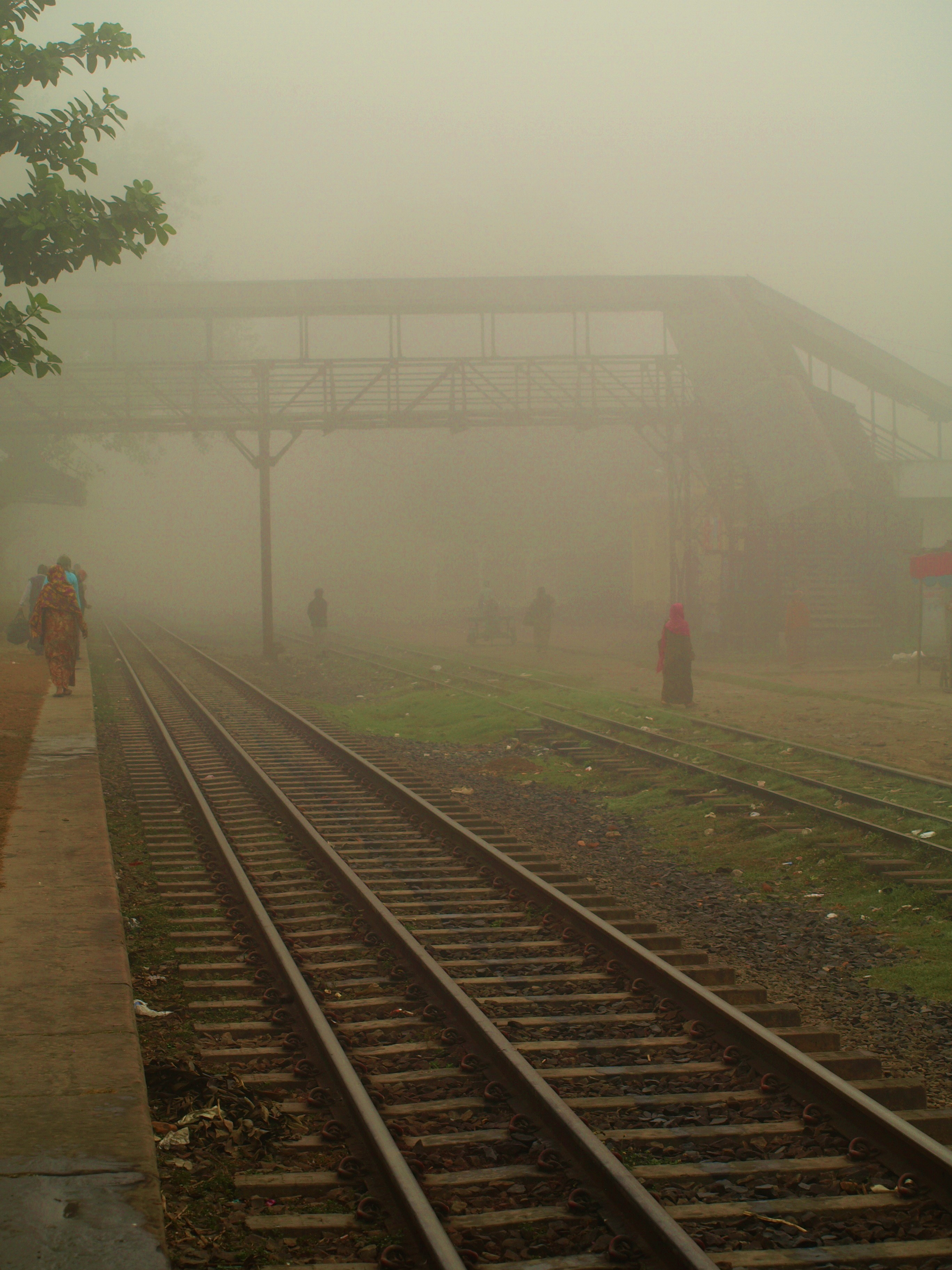
Azimnagar Rail Station Natore Bangladesh

== Death and legacy ==
In retaliation for his role, the North Bengal Sugar Mill was attacked by Pakistan Army on 5 May 1971. The army arrested 51 including 43 staff members of the mill. They were all executed on the banks of a pond in the residential area of the mill. After the Independence of Bangladesh, the pond was renamed Shaheed Sagar. Gopalpur Railway Station was renamed as Azimnagar Railway Station. On 14 December 1995, Bangladesh Post Office issued commemorative postal stamps in his name.
