= Mohammad Mujibur Rahman =

Bangladeshi politician

Member of Bangladesh Parliament

Personal details
- Party: Jatiya Party (Ershad)

Mohammad Mujibur Rahman is a Jatiya Party (Ershad) politician and a former member of parliament for Natore-2.

== Career ==
Rahman was elected to parliament from Natore-2 as a Jatiya Party candidate in 1986 and 1988.
