= Shahidul Islam Bakul =

Bangladeshi politician

MD. Shihedul Islam Bakul
- শহিদুল ইসলাম বকুল
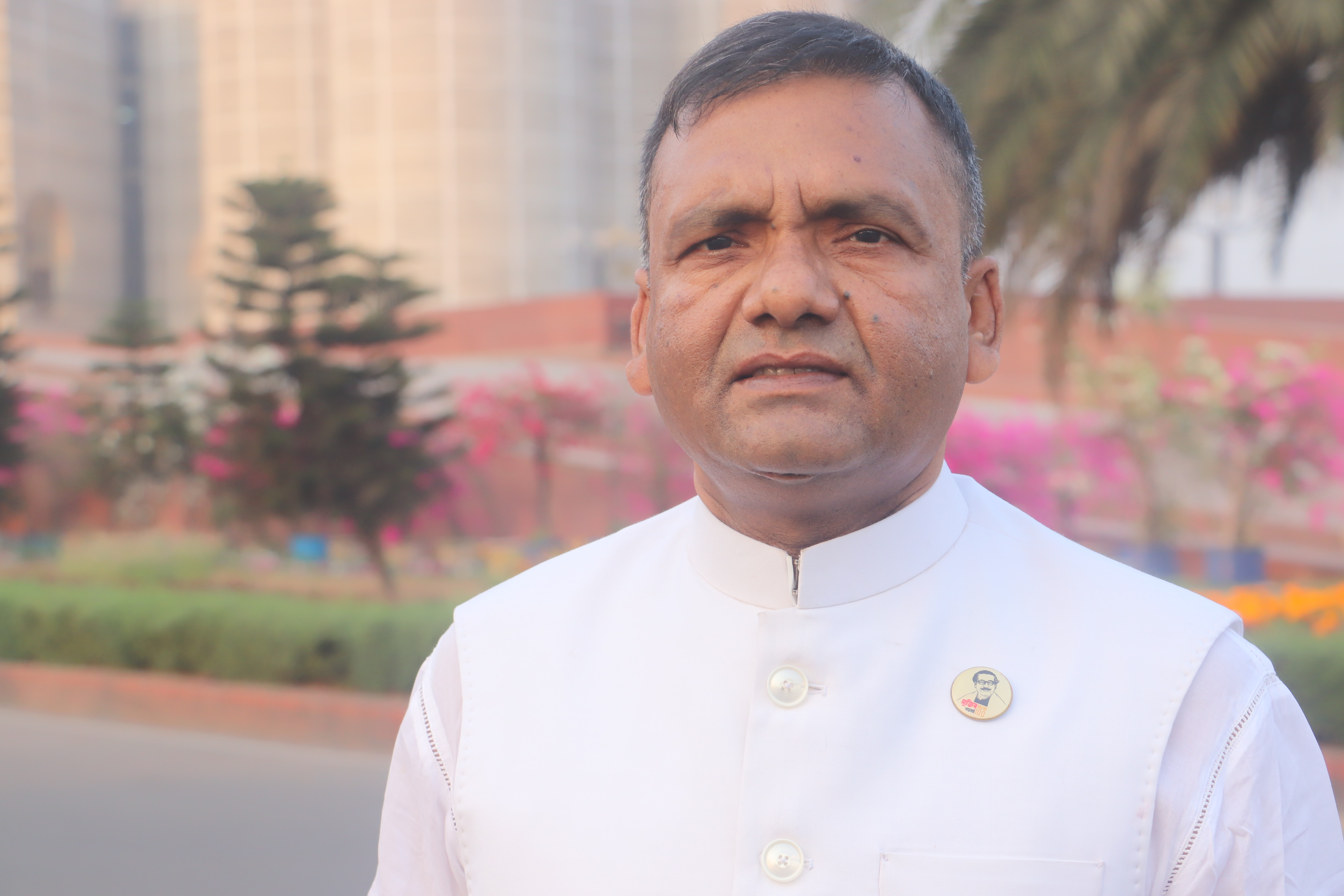

Member of Bangladesh Parliament

Member of Parliament for 58 Natore-1

Member of 11th Jatiya Sangsad

Personal details
- Born: 16 July 1972 (age 53)
- Citizenship: Bangladesh
- Party: Bangladesh Awami League
- Education: Bachelor of Social Science
- Occupation: Politician; Business
- Committees: Standing Committee on Ministry of Fisheries & Livestock
- Nickname: Bakul

Shahidul Islam Bakul is a Bangladesh Awami League politician and former Member of Parliament of Natore-1.

== Career ==
Bakul was elected to parliament from Natore-1 as a Bangladesh Awami League candidate 30 December 2018. Before election, his supporters blocked train service at his area demanding his nomination to the ruling party. Bakul is a member of the Parliamentary Standing Committee on Ministry of Fisheries & Livestock.
