= Naldanga Upazila =

Naldanga Upazila নলডাঙ্গা উপজেলা
- Upazila of Bangladesh
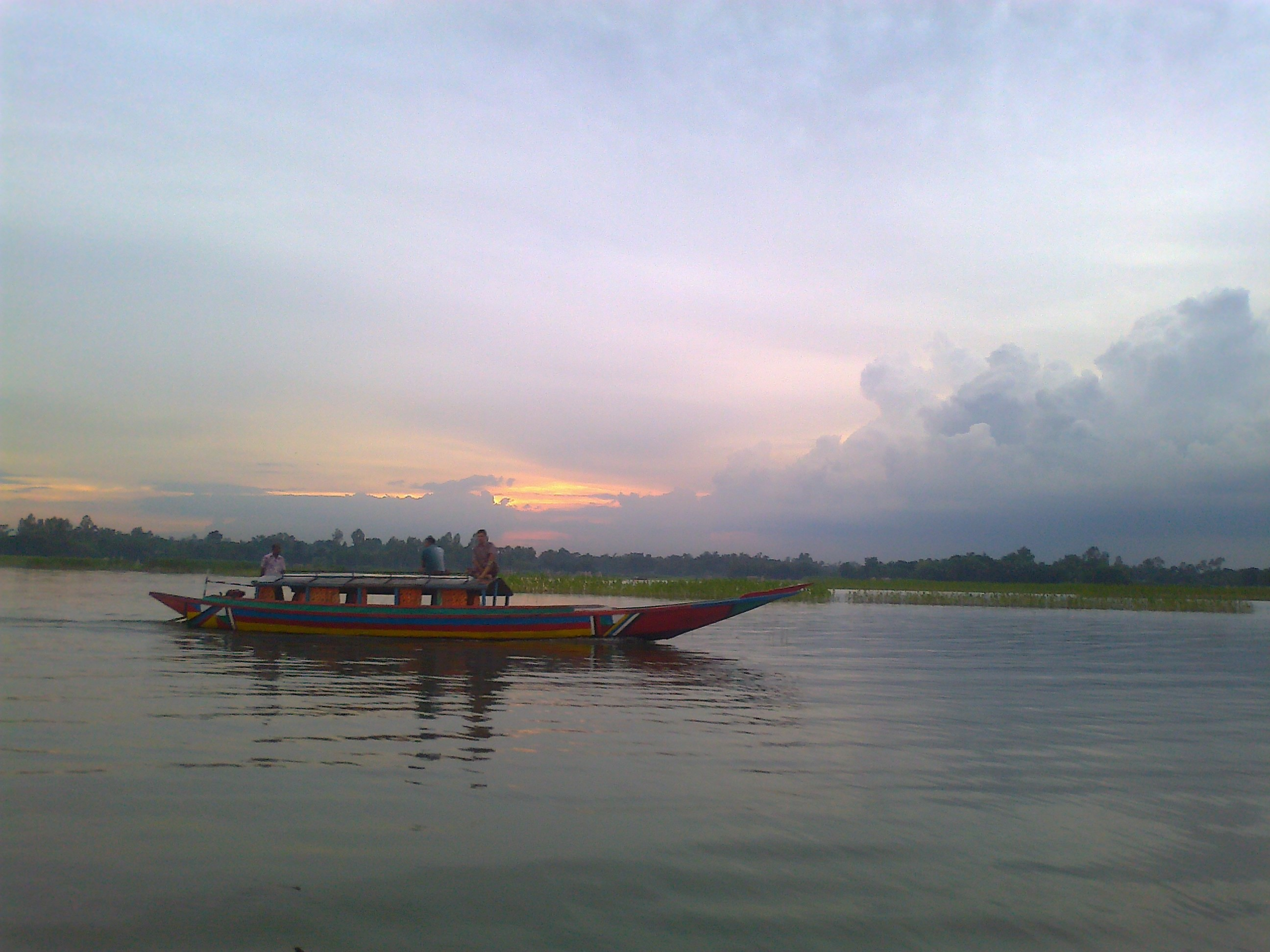
- Patul Beel in Naldanga Upazila

- Coordinates: 24°30′N 88°57′E
- Country: Bangladesh
- Division: Rajshahi
- District: Natore

Area
  - Total: 174.39 km^{2} (67.33 sq mi)

Population (2022)
  - Total: 135,318
  - Density: 775.95/km^{2} (2,009.7/sq mi)
- Time zone: UTC+6 (BST)
- Postal code: 6400
- Website: naldanga.natore.gov.bd

Naldanga Upazila mauza geocode map

Naldanga Upazila (Bengali: নলডাঙ্গা উপজেলা) is a subdistrict of Natore District, within Rajshahi Division in northern Bangladesh. Naldanga was previously a union of Natore Upazila in Rajshahi Division of Bangladesh but, in a Government gazette published in May 2013, Naldanga was declared an upazila of Bangladesh. Naldanga contains Naldanga Municipality and has 5 unions: Bipra Belgharia, Brahmapur, Khajuria, Madhnagar and Piprul.

== Demographics ==
Religions in Naldanga Upazila (2022)
Religion	Percent
Islam	92.67%
Hinduism	7.16%
Other or not stated	0.17%

According to the 2022 Bangladeshi census, Naldanga Upazila had 37,504 households and a population of 135,318. 7.85% of the population were under 5 years of age. Naldanga had a literacy rate (age 7 and over) of 70.73%: 73.36% for males and 68.24% for females, and a sex ratio of 95.93 males for every 100 females. 11,602 (8.57%) lived in urban areas.

According to the 2011 Census of Bangladesh, Naldanga Upazila had 33,507 households and a population of 129,304. 24,305 (18.80%) were under 10 years of age. Naldanga had a literacy rate (age 7 and over) of 51.37%, compared to the national average of 51.8%, and a sex ratio of 1010 females per 1000 males. 10,266 (7.94%) lived in urban areas. Ethnic population was 1,352 (1.05%).

== Administration ==
Naldanga upazila comprises Naldanga Municipality & five unions and 99 villages.

- Bipra Belgharia
- Brahmapur
- Khajura
- Madhnagar
  - West Madhavanagar
  - East Madhavanagar
  - Bhattpara
  - Nuriyagacha
  - Halthi
  - Madhabpur
  - Tehgria
  - Banshila
- Piprul
