= Gurudaspur Upazila =

Gurudaspur Upazila গুরুদাসপুর উপজেলা
- Upazila of Bangladesh
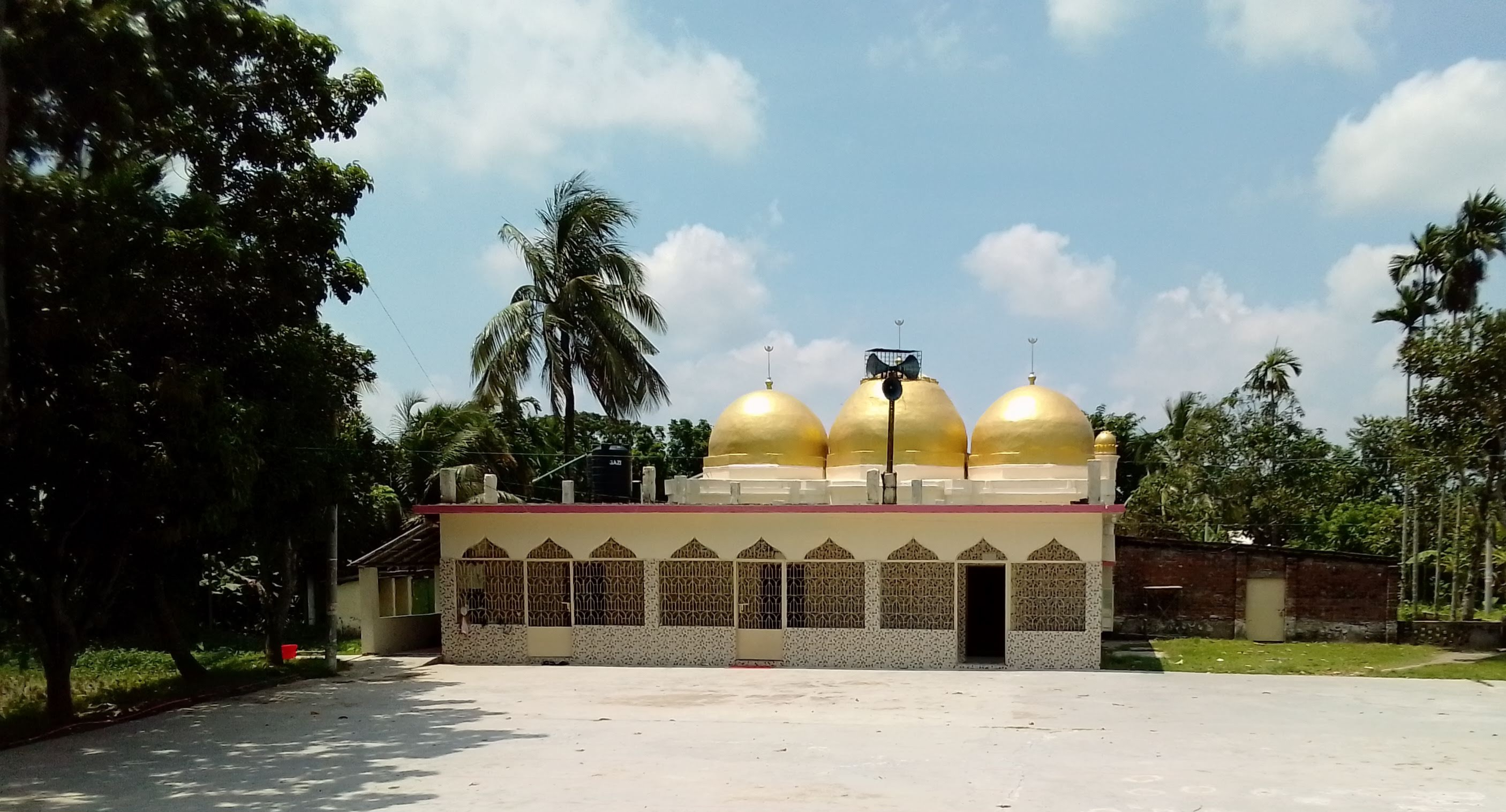
- Bri-Chapila Shahi Jame Mosque, Gurudaspur, Natore

- Coordinates: 24°22′N 89°15′E
- Country: Bangladesh
- Division: Rajshahi
- District: Natore

Area
  - Total: 203.20 km^{2} (78.46 sq mi)

Population (2022)
  - Total: 234,342
  - Density: 1,153.3/km^{2} (2,986.9/sq mi)
- Time zone: UTC+6 (BST)
- Postal code: 6440
- Area code: 07724
- Website: Official Map of Gurudaspur

Gurudaspur Upazila mauza geocode map

Gurudaspur Upazila (Bengali: গুরুদাসপুর উপজেলা) is an upazila of Natore District in the Division of Rajshahi, Bangladesh.

== Geography ==
Gurudaspur Upazila area 203.20 km^{2}, located in between 24°18' and 24°27' north latitudes and in between 88°04' and 89°19' east longitudes. The upazila is bounded by Singra and Tarash upazilas on the north, Baraigram upazila on the south, Tarash and Chatmohar upazilas on the east, Natore Sadar Upazila on the west. It has around 32,851 households.

== Demographics ==
Religions in Gurudaspur Upazila (2022)
Religion	Percent
Islam	96.47%
Hinduism	3.48%
Other or not stated	0.05%

According to the 2022 Bangladeshi census, Gurudaspur Upazila had 63,952 households and a population of 234,342. 8.24% of the population were under 5 years of age. Gurudaspur had a literacy rate (age 7 and over) of 68.97%: 71.05% for males and 66.97% for females, and a sex ratio of 97.60 males for every 100 females. 47,608 (20.32%) lived in urban areas.

According to the 2011 Census of Bangladesh, Gurudaspur Upazila had 54,977 households and a population of 214,788. 45,340 (21.11%) were under 10 years of age. Gurudaspur had a literacy rate (age 7 and over) of 41.92%, compared to the national average of 51.8%, and a sex ratio of 998 females per 1000 males. 32,807 (15.27%) lived in urban areas. Ethnic population was 1,036.

Par the 2001 Bangladesh census, Gurudaspur has a population of 194,228; male constituted 99086, female 95142; Muslim constituted 186,069, Hindu 7,873, Christian 34 and others 252. Indigenous communities such as Kaibarta, santal, oraon, Pahan, Turi and Bansphor belong to this upazila.

As of the 1991 Bangladesh census, Gurudaspur has a population of 173276. Males constitute 50.72% of the population, and females 49.28%. This Upazila's eighteen up population is 87290. Gurudaspur has an average literacy rate of 23.4% (7+ years), and the national average of 32.4% literate.

== Points of interest ==
Museum at village Khubjipur (1978), Chalan Beel Museum, Mosque at village Palshura Patpara, Mughal Mosque at village Piplar, Kusumhati Mosque (Sultanate period), Chapila Shahi Mosque, Gopinathpur Jami Mosque.

== Administration ==
Gurudaspur, formed as a Thana in 1917, was turned into an upazila in 1984.

Gurudaspur Upazila is divided into Gurudaspur Municipality and six union parishads: Biaghat, Chapila, Dharabarisha, Khubjipur, Moshinda, and Nazirpur. The union parishads are subdivided into 104 mauzas and 110 villages.

Gurudaspur Municipality is subdivided into 9 wards and 18 mahallas.

Upazila
Municipality	Union	Mouza	Village	Population		Density (per km^{2})	Literacy rate (%)	
1	6	104	108	Urban	Rural	974	Urban	Rural
1	6	104	108	165118	29110	974	46	32.9

Municipality
Area (km^{2})	Ward	Mahalla	Population	Density (per km^{2})	Literacy rate (%)
13.60	9	18	29110	2142	46.0

Union
Name of union and GO code	Area (acre)	Population		Literacy rate (%)
Name of union and GO code	Area (acre)	Male	Female	Literacy rate (%)
Khubjipur 60	5199	8423	8180	37.77
Chapila 27	8768	16339	15567	34.77
Dharabarisha 40	7894	14811	14583	32.11
Nazirpur 81	10678	18945	18072	33.83
Biaghat 13	10984	10649	10416	28.89
Moshinda 67	5769	14826	14307	30.71

Source Bangladesh Population Census 2001, Bangladesh Bureau of Statistics.

== See also ==
- Upazilas of Bangladesh
- Districts of Bangladesh
- Divisions of Bangladesh
