= Natore Sadar Upazila =

Natore Sadar Upazila নাটোর সদর উপজেলা
- Upazila of Bangladesh
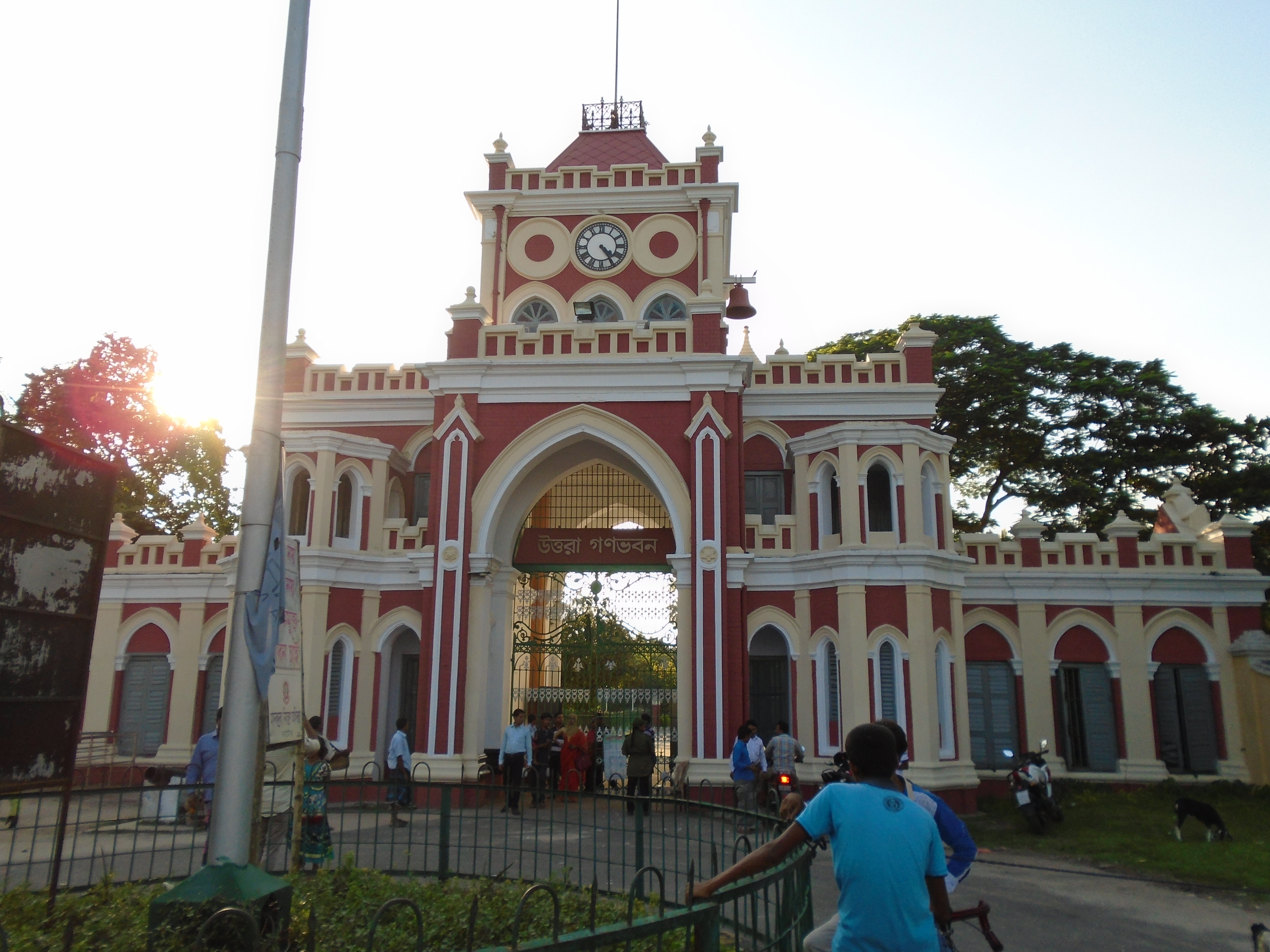
- Main gate of Uttara Ganabhaban

- Coordinates: 24°24.8′N 88°55.8′E
- Country: Bangladesh
- Division: Rajshahi
- District: Natore

Area
  - Total: 226.73 km^{2} (87.54 sq mi)

Population (2022)
  - Total: 352,967
  - Density: 1,556.8/km^{2} (4,032.0/sq mi)
- Time zone: UTC+6 (BST)
- Postal code: 6400
- Area code: 0771
- Website: Sadar.gif Official Map of Natore Sadar

Natore Sadar Upazila mauza geocode map

Natore Sadar Upazila (Bengali: নাটোর সদর উপজেলা) is an upazila of Natore District in the Division of Rajshahi, Bangladesh.

== Geography ==
Natore Sadar is located at 24.4139°N 88.9300°E. It has 76,696 households and a total area of 226.73 km^{2}. The upazila is bounded by Atrai and Baghmara upazilas on the north, Bagatipara and Baraigram upazilas on the south, Singra and Gurudaspur upazila on the east, Puthia and Baghmara upazilas on the west.

== Demographics ==
Religions in Natore Sadar Upazila (2022)
Religion	Percent
Islam	92.02%
Hinduism	7.67%
Other or not stated	0.31%

According to the 2022 Bangladeshi census, Natore Sadar Upazila had 94,585 households and a population of 352,967. 8.27% of the population were under 5 years of age. Natore Sadar had a literacy rate (age 7 and over) of 75.20%: 77.50% for males and 72.93% for females, and a sex ratio of 99.23 males for every 100 females. 99,504 (28.19%) lived in urban areas.

According to the 2011 Census of Bangladesh, Natore Sadar Upazila had 76,696 households and a population of 313,118. 49,422 (15.79%) were under 10 years of age. Natore Sadar had a literacy rate (age 7 and over) of 57.40%, compared to the national average of 51.8%, and a sex ratio of 988 females per 1000 males. 81,203 (25.93%) lived in urban areas. Ethnic population was 2,924 (0.93%).

As of the 1991 Bangladesh census, Natore Sadar has a population of 369,136. Males constitute 51.65% of the population, and females 48.35%. This Upazila's eighteen up population is 191,401. Natore Sadar has an average literacy rate of 31.2% (7+ years), and the national average of 32.4% literate.

== Administration ==
Natore Thana was formed in 1793 and it was turned into an upazila in 1984. Natore Municipality was formed in 1869.

Natore Sadar Upazila is divided Natore Municipality and following 7 union parishads: Bara Horispur, Chhatni, Dighapatia, Halsa, Kaphuria, Lukshmipur Kholabaria and Tebaria. The union parishads are subdivided into 263 mauzas and 297 villages.

Natore Municipality is subdivided into 9 wards.

Member of Parliament (MP): Ruhul Kuddus Talukdar Dulu.

== Education ==
According to Banglapedia, Natore Government Boys' High School, founded in 1944, is a notable secondary school.

== Places to visit ==
There are a number of interesting sites to visit in Natore Sadar upazila. Some of them are:

- Natore Rajbari
- Uttara Gonobhaban
- Chalan beel

== See also ==
- Upazilas of Bangladesh
- Districts of Bangladesh
- Divisions of Bangladesh
- Natore Rajbari
