= Bangladesh Sugar and Food Industries Corporation =

Government owned corporation in Bangladesh

Bangladesh Sugar and Food Industries Corporation বাংলাদেশ চিনি ও খাদ্য শিল্প কর্পোরেশন
- Formation: 1 July 1976
- Headquarters: Dhaka, Bangladesh
- Region served: Bangladesh
- Products: Sugar
- Official language: Bengali
- Website: bsfic.gov.bd

Bangladesh Sugar and Food Industries Corporation (BSFIC) is a government-owned corporation in Bangladesh that is in charge of sugar production. It is under the Ministry of Industries.

== History ==
Bangladesh Sugar and Food Industries Corporation was established on 1 July 1976. The corporation was in charge of 15 state-run sugar mills of the country in 2015. It tried to export sugar to Europe.

In 2012 private dealers didn't take order from the corporation, as it offered a higher price than the market. It has lobbied for more tariffs on imports to increase sales and reduce its stockpile of sugar.

In 2014, BSFIC started selling sugar at 40 taka per kg, which was half of the production cost.

== List of nationalised sugar mills ==
About 16 sugar mills were nationalised following the independence of Bangladesh, and later they became subsidiaries of the industrial enterprise placed under Bangladesh Sugar Mills Corporation. The list is given below:

- Faridpur Sugar Mills
- Jaipurhat Sugar Mills
- Kushtia Sugar Mills
- Kaliachapra Sugar Mills
- Mobarakganj Sugar Mills
- National Sugar Mills
- North Bengal Sugar Mills
- Panchagarh Sugar Mills
- Rajshahi Sugar Mills
- Rangpur Sugar Mills
- Shyampur Sugar Mills
- Setabganj Sugar Mills
- Thakurgaon Sugar Mills
- Zeal Bangla Sugar Mills
- Desh Bandhu Sugar Mills
