= Natore District =

Natore District নাটোর জেলা
- District of Bangladesh
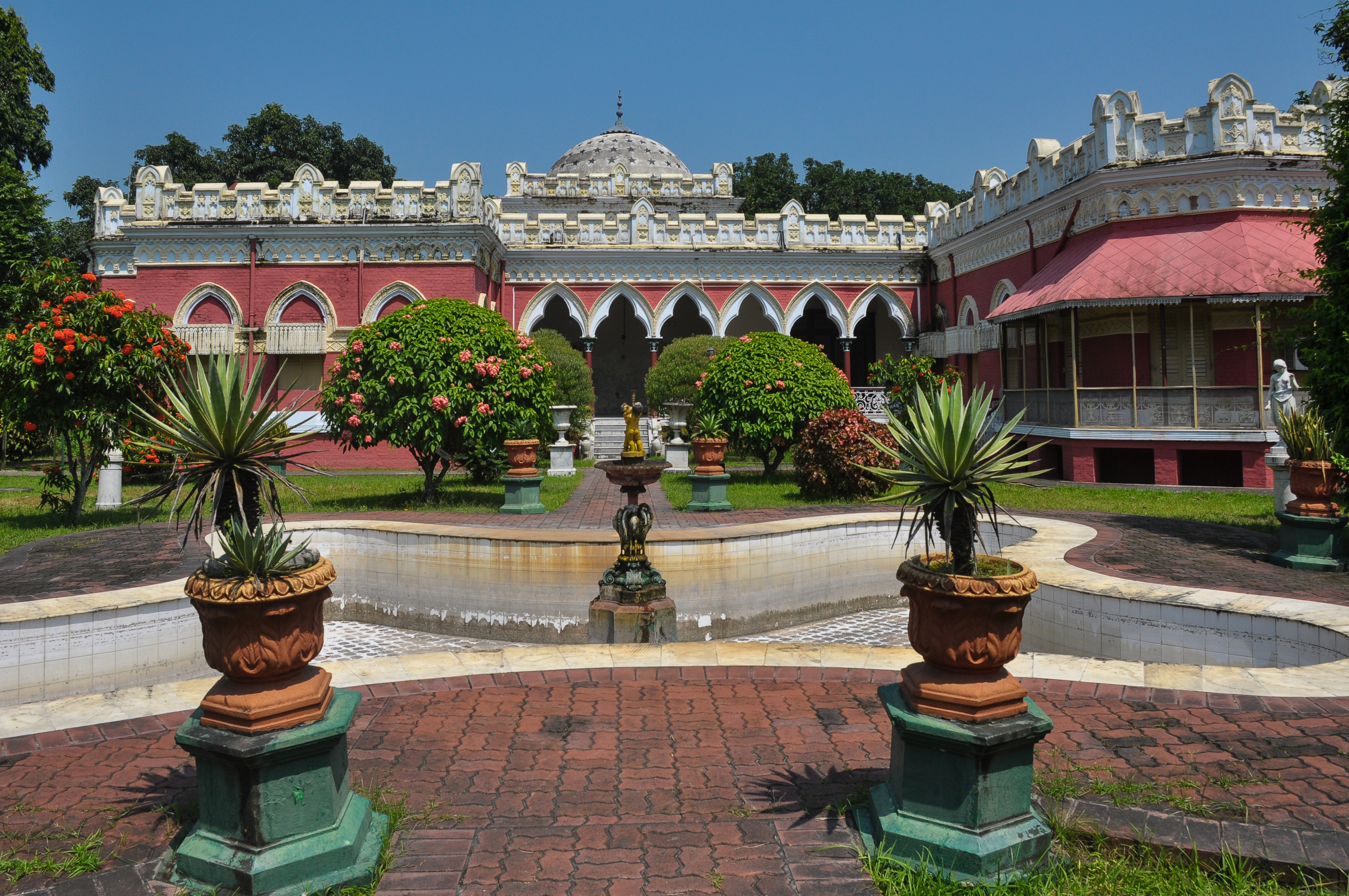
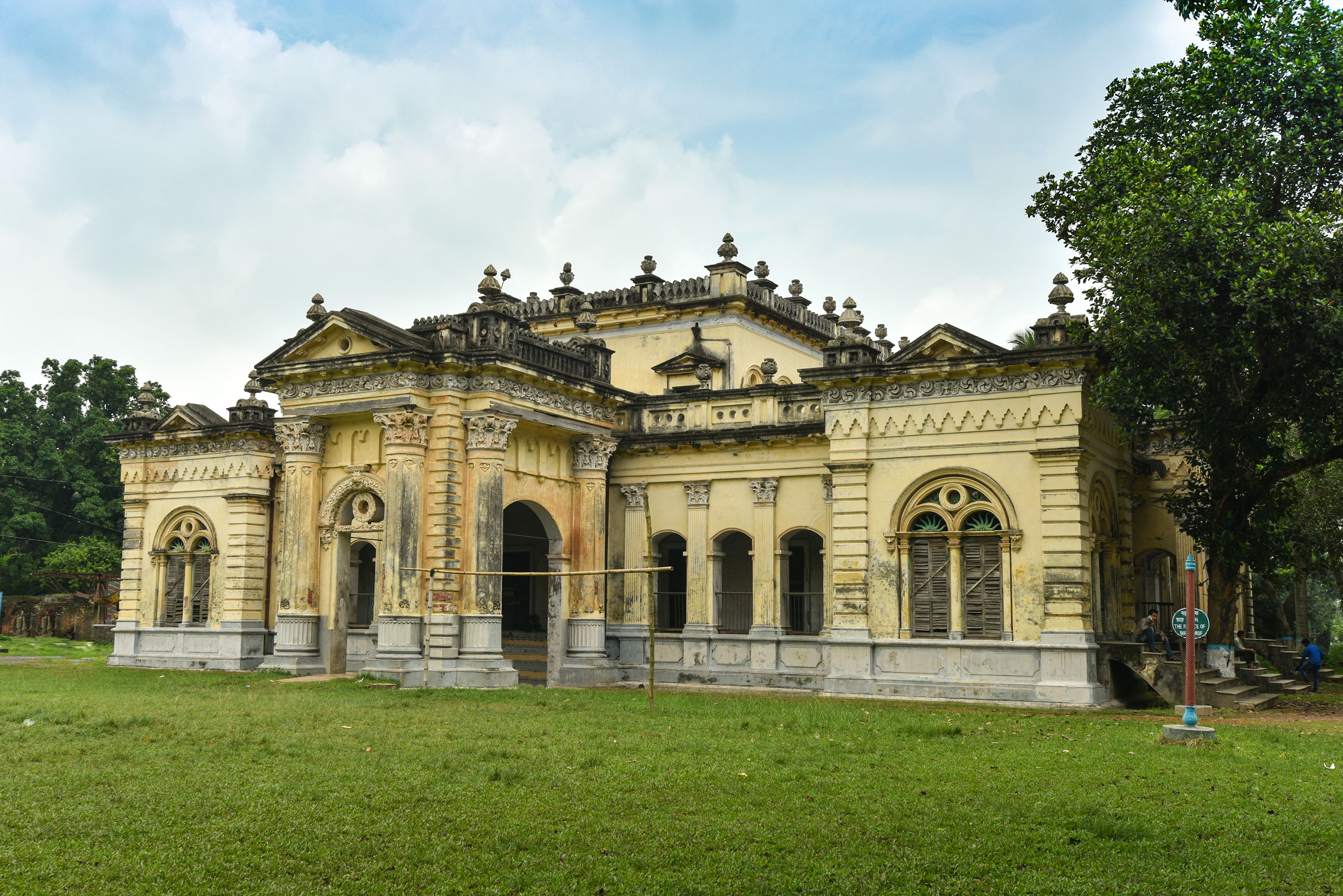
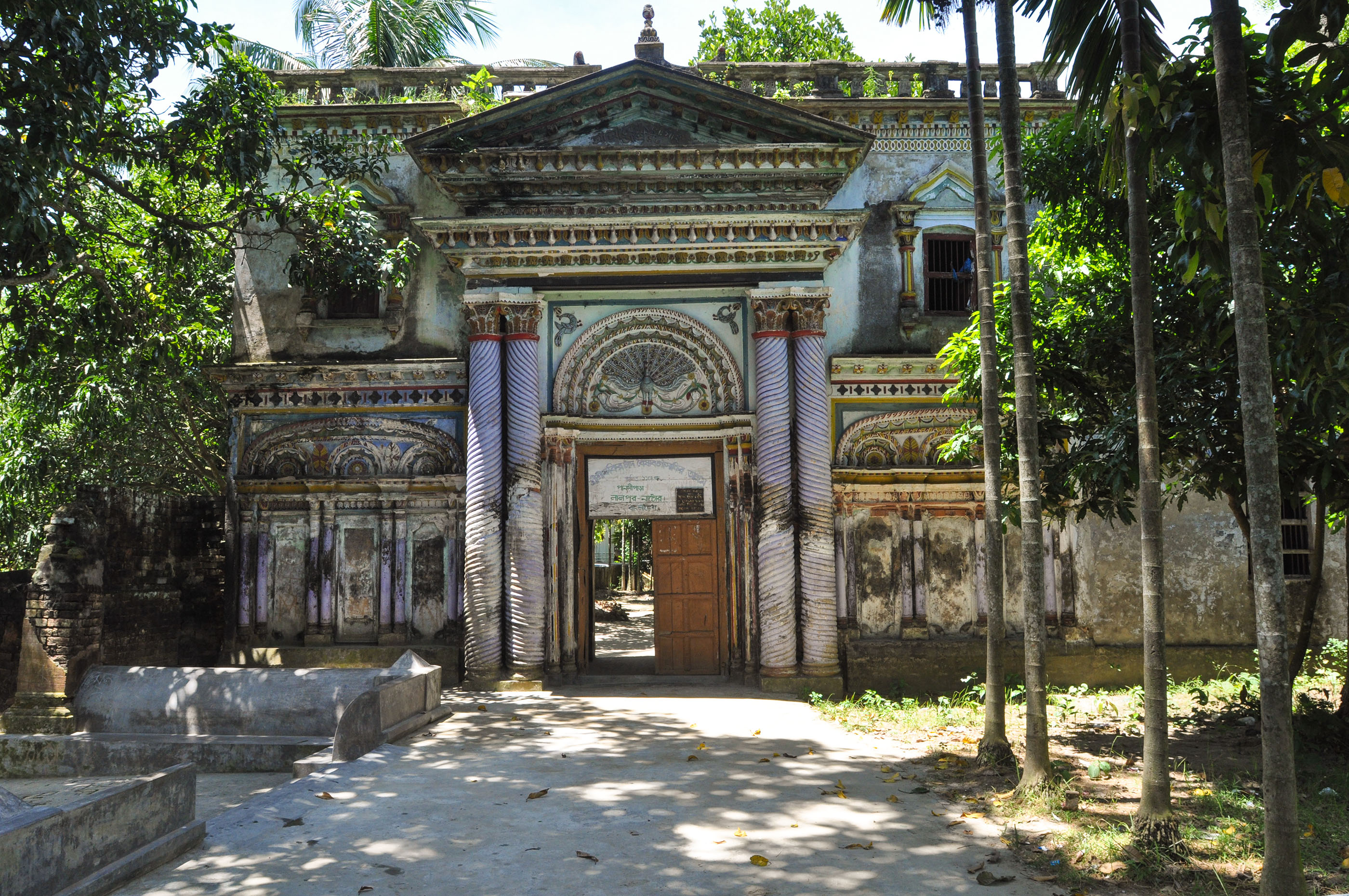
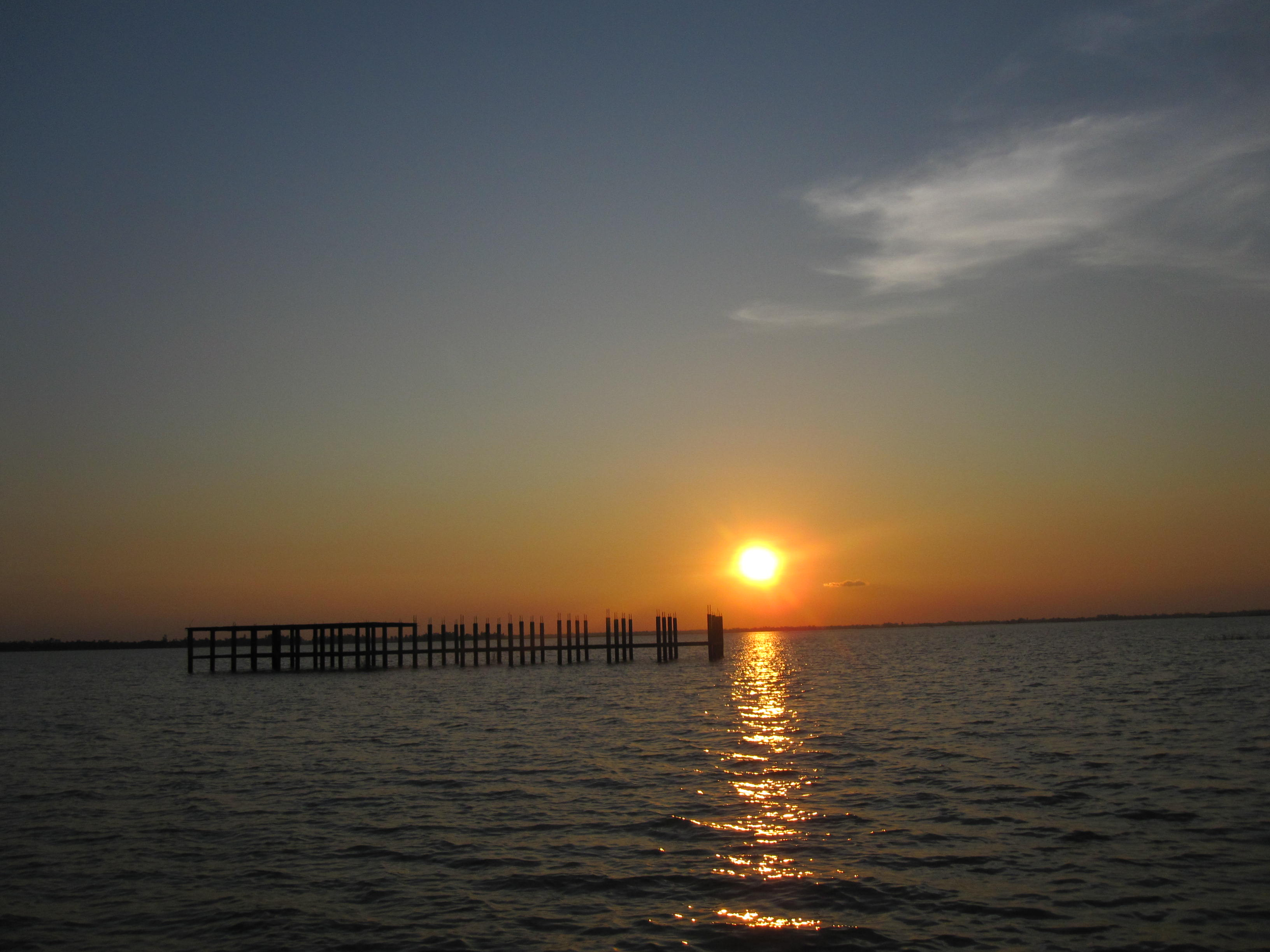
- Clockwise from top-left: Uttara Gano Bhaban, Akhra Bhabon Chalan Beel, Natore Rajbari

- Location of Natore in Bangladesh
- Expandable map of Natore
- Coordinates: 24.41°N 88.93°E
- Country: Bangladesh
- Division: Rajshahi
- Headquarters: Natore

Government
  - Deputy Commissioner: Asma Shaheen

Area
  - Total: 1,900.19 km^{2} (733.67 sq mi)

Population (2022)
  - Total: 1,859,922
  - Density: 978.808/km^{2} (2,535.10/sq mi)
- Time zone: UTC+06:00 (BST)
- Postal code: 6400
- Area code: 0771
- ISO 3166 code: BD-44
- HDI (2019): 0.612; medium · 9th of 21

Natore District (Bengali: নাটোর জেলা) is a district in Rajshahi Division located in northern Bangladesh. It borders the metropolitan city of Rajshahi and used to be a part of Rajshahi District.

== History ==
Natore followed the same history as that of Rajshahi district. Formerly part of the Pundravardhana region, Natore became part of the various Pundravardhana-based kingdoms, most prominently the Palas. After the Senas succeeded the Palas, Natore became part of their kingdom before Muslim invasions in the 13th century. In the early 15th century, Raja Ganesha, a Hindu nobleman ruling over Bhaturia in the erstwhile Rajshahi district, managed to take over the Bengal Sultanate. His son, Jalauddin Muhammad Shah, converted to Islam and strengthened the sultanate's authority. During the time of the Bengal Sultanate, authority over local rulers varied. As Natore was relatively close to the old Bengal capitals, it fell under Mughal rule quickly in the late 16th century, although the local notables maintained considerable autonomy.

During Mughal rule, the district was split between Sarkars Barbakabad and Bazuha of the Bengal Subah, and much of it was under the control of local notables. The Natore Raj family controlled the region around Natore, and was given more land to the north and south of the Padma by Murshid Quli Khan after two rebellions by previous zamindars failed. During the Maratha raids into Bengal, a Maratha force penetrated to Pakuria near Singra, originally to restore property to the Bhawanipur Shaktipeeth in Bogra, but then to loot the Thakurs of Pakuria. The Pakuria Thakurs offered no resistance but entertained the Maratha general so much he gave them a sword.

After the East India Company occupied Bengal, they imposed the Permanent Settlement, which led to the breakup of the Rajshahi Raj Zamindari. The district was partly affected by the Fakir-Sanyasi rebellion, which was often supported by Zamindars in the Natore region. Natore was the district headquarters of Rajshahi from 1769 to 1825. Administrative Natore subdivision was established in 1825 under Rajshahi district, on the eve of the shifting of the headquarters.

In 1845, Natore Mahakuma was established. The Natore Municipality was established in 1869.

During the Bangladesh War in 1971, a battle was fought between the Pakistani Army and the militants of Mukti Bahini on 29 March in Lalpur Upazila, causing significant casualties to the Pakistan Army. This was followed up by the Gopalpur massacre on 5 May 1971, in which the Pakistan Army killed employees of North Bengal Sugar Mills, including its general manager M Anwarul Azim, who was identified as an accomplice of the Mukti Bahini.

== Geography ==
Most parts of the district are plain land. The northern part of the district (parts of Singra Upazila) is part of the Barind Tract, an area of red clay that is relatively elevated from the rest of the district. A small part of the district adjoining the Padma River consists of very recent alluvial deposits. The most part of the district is a low-lying, swampy area consisting of many beels and small streams. Chalan Beel, the largest beel in Bangladesh, covers part of the eastern part of this district.

Several rivers cross the district. The Padma is at the extreme south of the district, bordering Kushtia district, while the Atrai River flows southeast through the centre of the district. There are various tributaries that connect the Atrai to the Padma and other river systems further east.

Natore District is 1,900.05 km^{2} (733.61 sq mi). It is bordered by Naogaon and Bogra districts to the north, Pabna and Kushtia districts to the south, Pabna and Sirajganj districts to the east, and Rajshahi district to the west. The road distance from Natore to Dhaka is 220 kilometres. Lalpur is the area with the lowest average annual rainfall in Bangladesh.

== Demographics ==
Historical population
Year	Pop.	±% p.a.
1974	858,619	—
1981	1,067,058	+3.15%
1991	1,387,761	+2.66%
2001	1,521,336	+0.92%
2011	1,706,673	+1.16%
2022	1,859,922	+0.78%

According to the 2022 Census of Bangladesh, Natore District has 501,957 households and a population of 1,859,922, with an average of 3.66 people per household. Among the population, 305,843 (16.44%) inhabitants are under 10 years of age. The population density is 979 people per km^{2}. Natore District has a literacy rate (age 7 and over) of 71.51%, compared to the national average of 74.80%, and a sex ratio of 97.88 males per 100 females. Approximately 19.15% (356,166) of the population lives in urban areas. The ethnic population is 11,198 (0.60%), mainly Oraon, Mal Pahari, and Santal.

Religions in Natore District (2022)
Religion	Percent
Islam	93.78%
Hinduism	5.76%
Christianity	0.42%
Other or not stated	0.04%

Religion in present-day Natore District
Religion	1941 (Note: Natore subdivision of Rajshahi district)		1981		1991		2001		2011		2022	
Religion	Pop.	%	Pop.	%	Pop.	%	Pop.	%	Pop.	%	Pop.	%
Islam	276,237	74.02%	943,224	88.39%	1,255,550	90.47%	1,409,634	92.66%	1,590,919	93.22%	1,744,274	93.78%
Hinduism	85,731	22.97%	112,918	10.58%	117,530	8.47%	101,550	6.68%	103,747	6.08%	107,124	5.76%
Tribal religion	9,863	2.64%	—N/a	—N/a	—N/a	—N/a	—N/a	—N/a	—N/a	—N/a	—N/a	—N/a
Christianity	855	0.23%	6,295	0.59%	8,432	0.61%	8,282	0.54%	8,054	0.47%	7,844	0.42%
Others (Note: Including Jainism, Buddhism, Zoroastrianism, Judaism, Ad-Dharmis, or not stated)	499	0.14%	4,621	0.44%	6,249	0.45%	1,870	0.12%	3,953	0.23%	680	0.04%
Total Population	373,185	100%	1,067,058	100%	1,387,761	100%	1,521,336	100%	1,706,673	100%	1,859,922	100%

Muslims make up 93.78% of the population, while Hindus are 5.76% of the population. The Muslim population has constantly increased, while the Hindu population has generally decreased.

== Economy ==
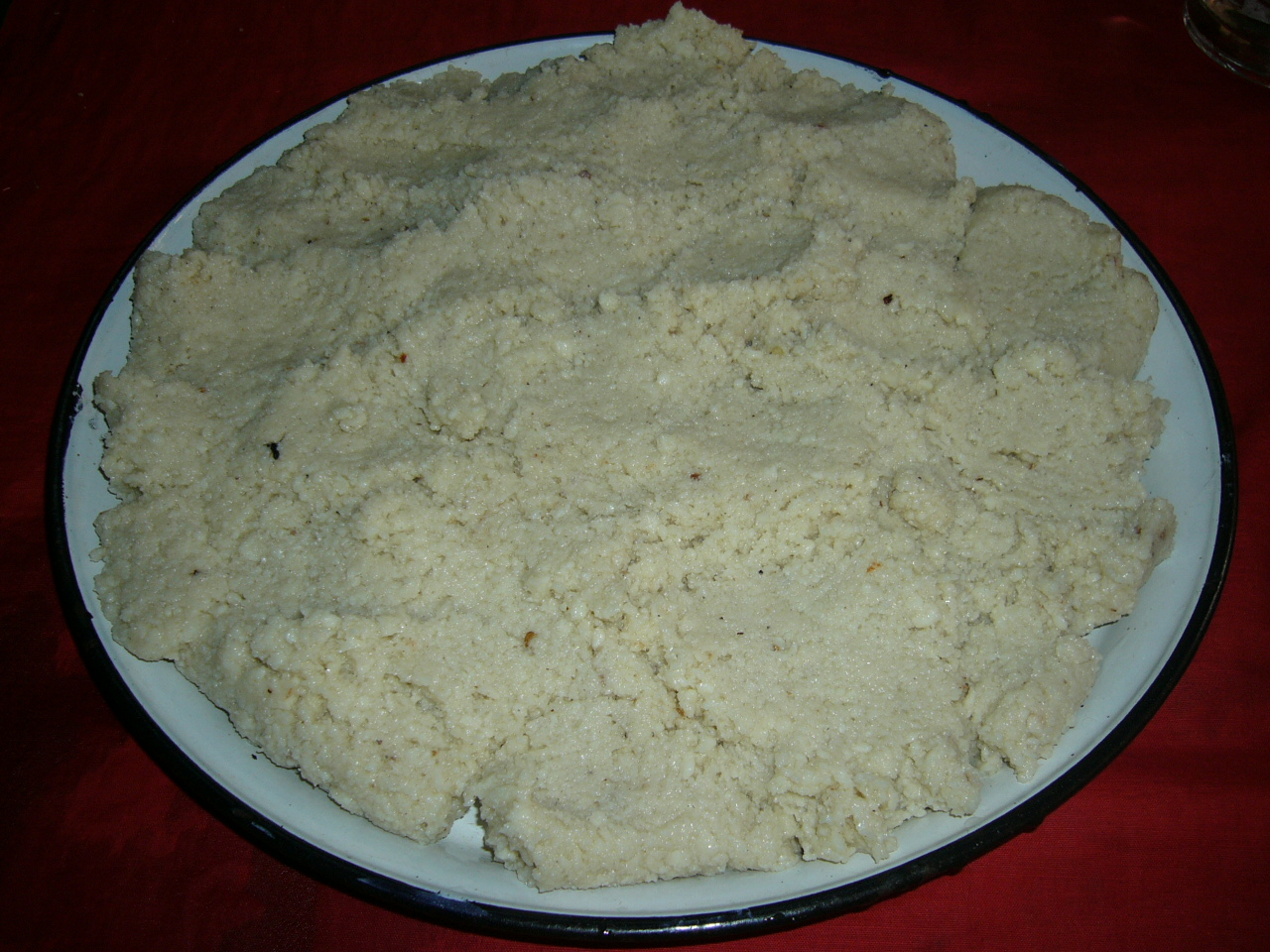
Kacha Golla is a kind of sweet made from milk and available in Natore District.

The economy of Natore is based on agriculture.

There are 2 sugar mills in Natore: North Bengal Sugar Mills Limited and Natore Sugar Mills Limited. They are owned and operated by Bangladesh Sugar and Food Industries Corporation.

Pran Agro Ltd., Ekdala, Natore Sadar (2005) is a private food manufacturing plant of PRAN-RFL Group. Jamuna Distillery Limited (1995) is another private industry of Jamuna Group. The distillery produces industrial alcohol, and is situated near Natore Sugar Mills Limited.

=== Hats, bazaars, and fairs ===
The total number of hats and bazaars is 152. There are 13 fairs. Bonpara Bazar (which is situated 18 km from Natore town) is a traditional bazar that sits every Saturday and Tuesday. Bonpara is one of the biggest hats of Natore and Bangladesh.

== Points of interest ==
Tourist attractions in Natore include Rani Bhabanir Rajbari, the palace of Rani Bhabani of Natore. It is a historical palace, situated in the Bongojol area near Natore zero (Madrasamore/old bus stand). There is a college and schools named after Rani Bhobani.

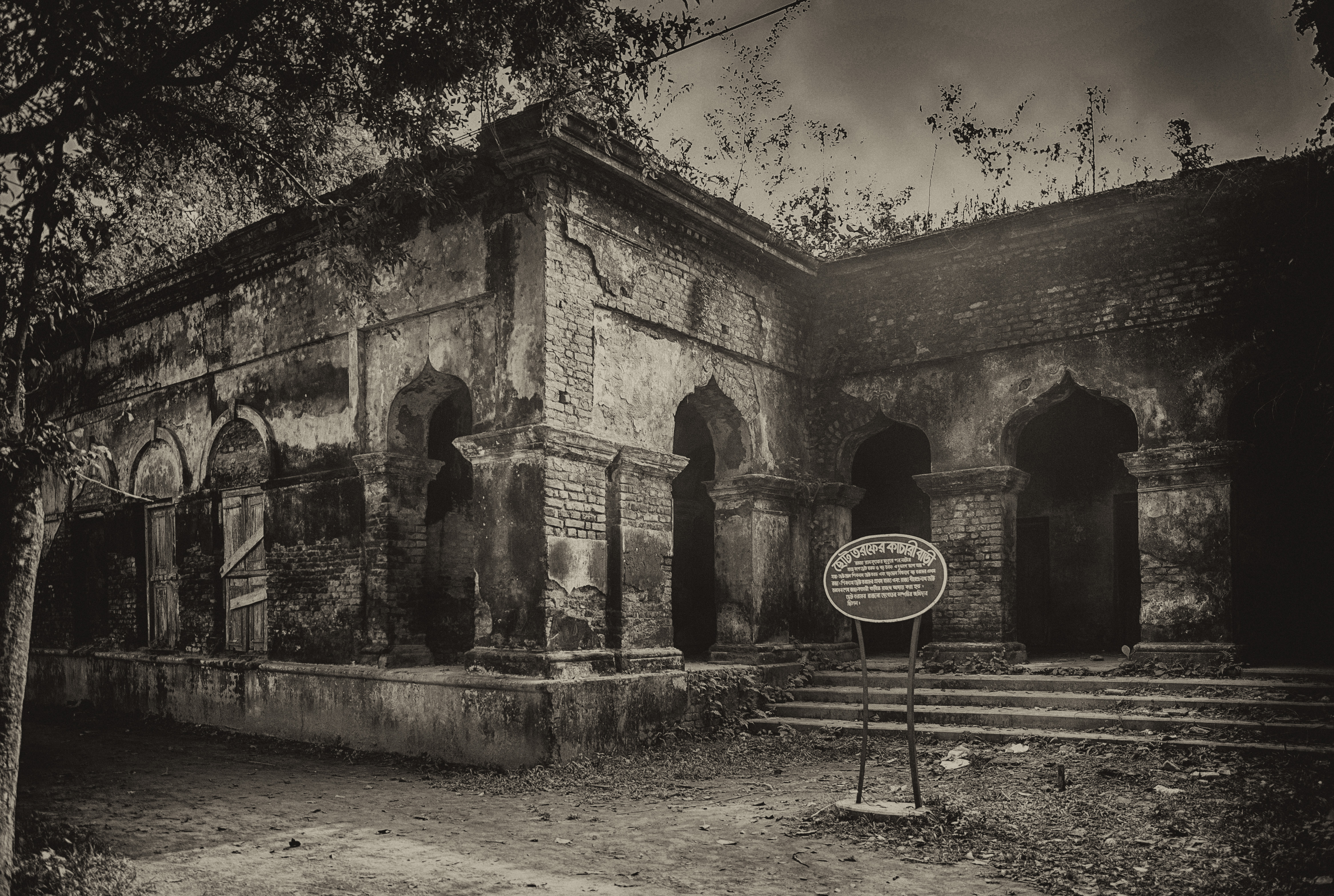
Kachari Bari, Natore.

Chalan Beel is a large natural wetland. During the monsoon, the area of the Bil increases and touches four upazilas (sub-districts) of the district. The picnic parties come to Cholon Bil every season.

Uttara Gonobhaban (formerly known as Dighapotia Rajbari) is the former residence of the kings of Natore. Today it is the official residence of the Prime Minister in North Bengal.

== Administration ==
Natore District upazila geocode map

Natore was the district headquarters of Rajshahi from 1769 to 1825. At the eve of that replacement, Natore was declared as a subdivision. That event made Natore the first subdivision of Bangladesh. Natore was established as a district in 1984.

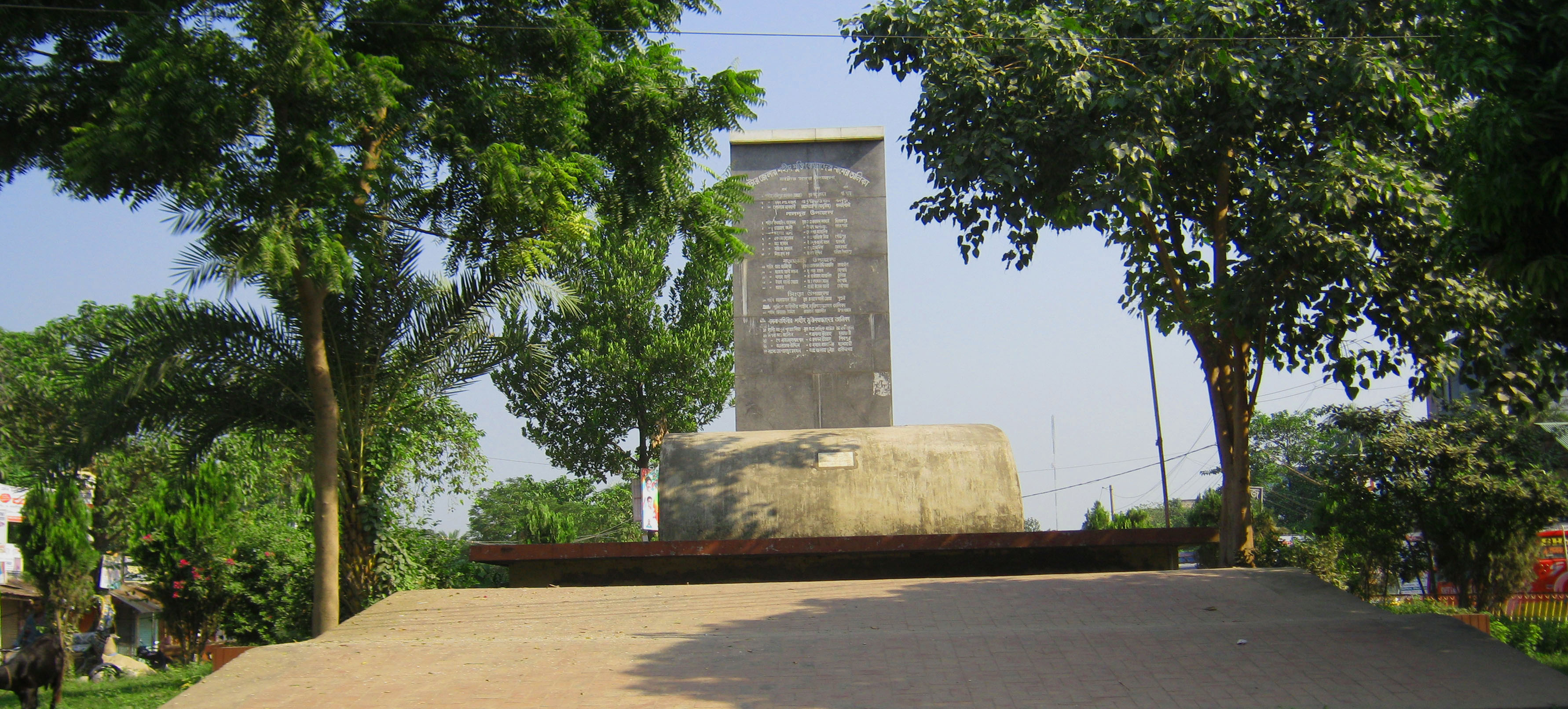
Monument with names of martyrs

There are seven upazilas in the district:

- Bagatipara Upazila
- Baraigram Upazila
- Gurudaspur Upazila
- Lalpur Upazila
- Naldanga Upazila
- Natore Sadar Upazila
- Singra Upazila

The town has a population of 120,000; the male population percentage is 51.57%, and the female population percentage is 48.43%. The density of population is 4,825. Chalkbuddhnath, Station bajar, Borgasa, Alaipur, Kanaikhali, Nichabazar, Lalbazar, Madrasamor, and Bongojal are the most populated areas of Natore town.

The Deputy Commissioner is Asma Shaheen. The Superintendent of Police is Liton Kumar Shaha, and the Administrator of Zila Porishod is Advocate Sajedur Rahman Khan Chowdhury.

== Notable persons ==
- Rani Bhabani (1715–1802), zamindar
- Maharaja Jagadindra Nath Roy Bahadur (1868–1925), Maharaja of Natore, Zamindar of Natore from Bengal
- Jadunath Sarkar (1870–1958)
- Sarat Kumar Rai (1876–1946)
- Madar Bux (1907 – 20 January 1967), politician
- Ashraf Ali Khan Chowdhury, Bengali lawyer and politician
- Taijul Islam, Bangladeshi cricketer
- Zunaid Ahmed Palak, MP
- Farida Parveen, Bangladeshi folk singer
- Shankar Gobind Chowdhury, politician
- M. M. Rahmatullah, bureaucrat and politician
- Banalata Sen of Natore (fictional character)
- Sultana Zaman

== See also ==
- Zamindar of Natore
- Singra Natore Family
- Maharajas of Dighapatia
- Maharajas of Natore
- Upazilas of Bangladesh
- Districts of Bangladesh
- Divisions of Bangladesh
- Administrative geography of Bangladesh
