= Natore Rajbari =

Royal palace in Natore, Bangladesh

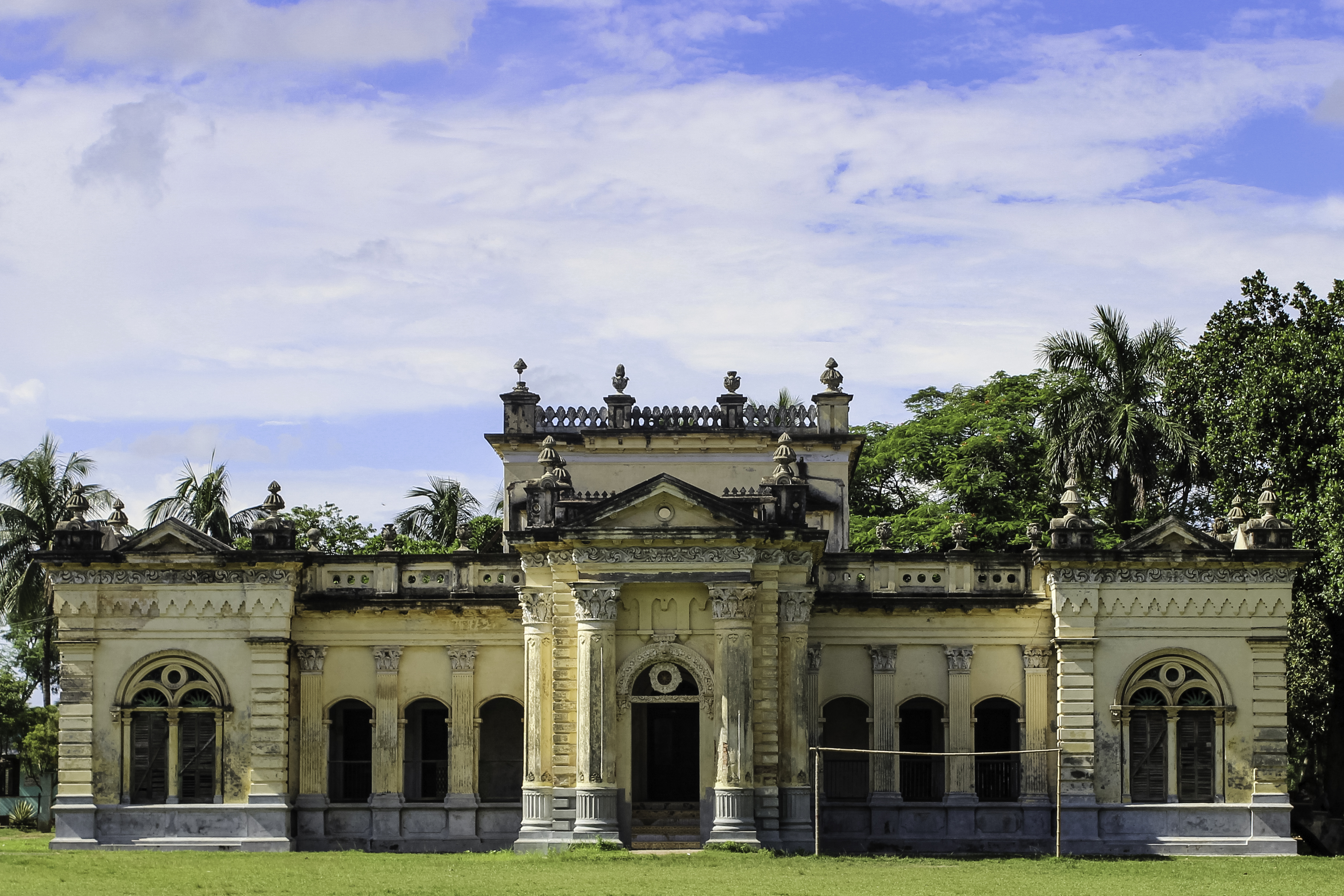

- Location within Bangladesh

Location
- Location: Rajshahi, Bangladesh
- Coordinates: 24.4202°N 88.9915°E

Architecture
- Style: Neoclassical and Indo-Saracenic architecture
- Established: (1706–1710) 18th century
- Interior area: 50.42 acres (20.40 ha)

Natore Rajbari (also known as Pagla Raja's Palace, Natore Palace) was a royal palace in Natore, Bangladesh. It was the residence and seat of the Rajshahi Raj family of zamindars. The famous queen Rani Bhabani lived here and after the death of her husband, expanded both the estate and the palace.

== History ==
In the mid seventeenth century one Kamadev Moitra served as tehsildar to the Puthia Raj family. Kamadev's second son Raghunandan Moitra was selected by the Raja to be his agent at the court of Nawab Murshid Quli Khan, the overlord of all Bengal. When the Nawab moved his court from Dhaka to what became known as Murshidabad he took Raghunandan with him and appointed him his Dewan or minister. The Nawab proceeded to confiscate the estates of zamindars who failed to conform to his new regulations, and a number of such estates were acquired by Ramjivan Moitra, the elder brother of his Dewan Raghunandan. In due course Ramjivan was given the title of Raja and set up his headquarters in Natore. His estate was generally referred to as the "Rajshahi Zamindari".

The estate had an area of nearly 13,000 square miles and included not only much of North Bengal but also large parts of the areas later comprising the administrative districts of Murshidabad, Nadia, Jessore, Birbhum and Burdwan. To rule this extensive Zamindari and collect revenue properly, he divided all Zamindaris into three centers. These were Sherpur in Bogra district, Baranagar in Murshidabad district and Natore. Baranagar was located half a mile north of Azimnagar railway station by the administrative advantages. Rarely Raghunandan had to go to Nawab Darbar, so he stayed at Baranagar most of the time. Staying at Baranagar helped him to maintain the royal duty of Natore.

The first palace or Rajbari at Natore was built by Raja Ramjivan Moitra. The palace was surrounded by two sets of moats which are still extant. After the division of the estate a separate palace was built for the junior branch of the dynasty. Many of the original buildings were destroyed by the earthquake of 1897 and subsequently rebuilt or replaced.

Ramjivan's Dewan Doyaram was granted landed estates and the title of Ray Raiyan by Nawab Murshid Quli Khan in recognition of his service in apprehending a recalcitrant zamindar named Sitaram Roy. In due course Doyaram established his own dynasty the Dighapatia Raj with its own palace Dighapatia Palace.

Raja Ramjivan was succeeded by his adopted son Ramkanta. After Raja Ramkanta's early death the Natore estate was ably managed by his widow, known as Rani Bhabani, who became famous for her good works.

In 1797, following the death of Rani Bhabani's adopted son Raja Ramkrishna, the Natore estate was divided between his two sons Bishwanath and Sibnath, and thenceforth both a Senior and a Junior royal house remained in existence until the abolition of all zamindar estates in 1950.

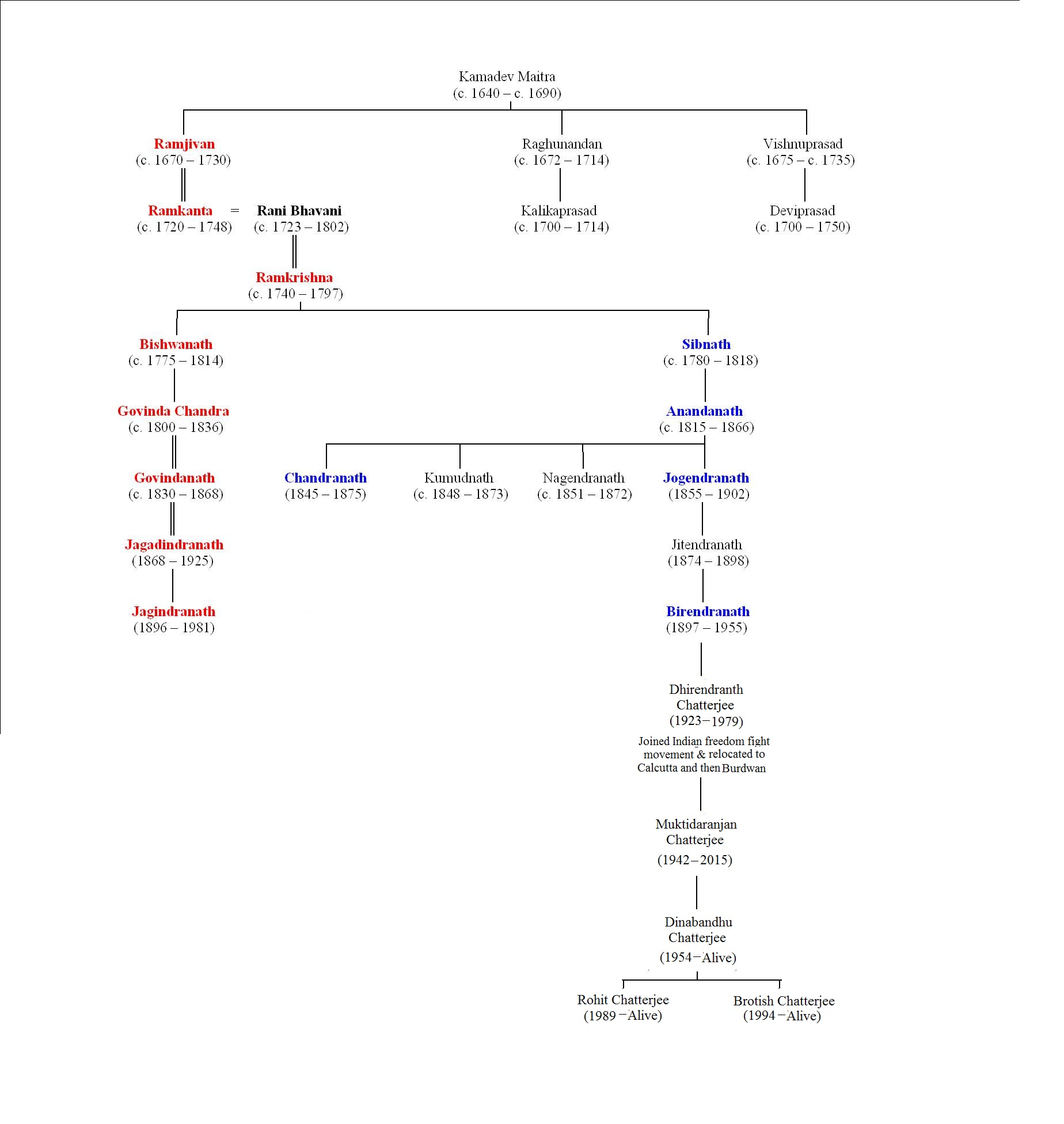

== Historical references ==
The zamindari of Rajshahi, the second in rank in Bengal and yielding an annual revenue of about twenty-five lakhs of rupees, has risen to its present magnitude during the course of the last eighty years by accumulating the property of a great number of dispossessed zamindars, although the ancestors of the present possessor had not, by inheritance, a right to the property of a single village within the whole zamindari. - Warren Hastings

[The Rajshahi Zamindari] is the most unwieldy extensive zamindari of Bengal or perhaps in India. [It] produces at least four-fifths of all the silk, raw or manufactured, used in or exported from the ... Empire of Hindustan. - James Grant

== Timeline ==
(Some dates approximate)

- 1670 Kamadev Maitra(Moitra) became Tahsildar (tax officer) of Raja Naranarayan of Puthia.
- 1695 Kamadev's son Raghunandan was appointed Vakeel (agent) for Raja Darpanarayan of Puthia at the court of Nawab Murshid Quli Khan in Dhaka.
- 1702 Nawab Murshid Quli Khan shifted his court from Dhaka to Murshidabad. Raghunandan was appointed his Dewan, based at Baranagar, Murshidabad.
- 1706 Raghunandan's elder brother Ramjivan started to acquire estates confiscated by the Nawab (including Rajshahi, Bhaturia and Jessore).
- 1710 Ramjivan, as Raja of the Rajshahi Zamindari, settled in Natore and built his palace.
- 1710 The orphan Dayaram was appointed Dewan of Raja Ramjivan.
- 1714 Dayaram was granted the title of Ray Raiyan by the Nawab.
- 1714 Death of Ramjivan's only son, Kalu Kumar. Ramjivan adopted Ramkanta.
- 1725 Death of Nawab Murshid Quli Khan.
- 1730 Death of Raja Ramjivan, accession of Raja Ramkanta with Dayaram Ray as Dewan.
- 1748 Death of Raja Ramkanta. His widow Rani Bhavani became effective regent.
- 1750 Ramkrishna, adopted by Rani Bhavani, became Raja of Natore.
- 1750 Dayaram Ray became the first Raja of Dighapatia.
- 1760 Rani Bhavani became famous for her benevolent works (reservoirs, roads, bridges, temples, Sanskrit schools, scholarships, dispensaries).
- 1770 Great Bengal famine. Rani Bhavani expended huge amounts on relief.
- 1774 East India Company seized part of the Raja's estate.
- 1780 Rani Bhavani retired to Baranagar, leaving Raja Ramkrishna in charge at Natore.
- 1793 East India Company abolished Nizamat: powers of Rajas restricted, taxation increased
- 1797 Death of Raja Ramkrishna. Natore Raj divided into Senior and Junior branches. Accession of Raja Bishwanath (senior), Raja Sibnath (junior).
- 1814 Accession of senior Raja Govinda Chandra (son of Bishwanath).
- 1818 Accession of junior Raja Anandanath (son of Sibnath).
- 1836 Accession of senior Raja Govindanath (adopted son of Govinda Chandra).
- 1850 Junior Raja Anandanath made Raja Bahadur, C.S.I. by Government of India.
- 1866 Accession of junior Raja Chandranath (son of Anandanath).
- 1868 Accession of senior Raja Jagadindranath (adopted son of Govindanath).
- 1870 Junior Raja Chandranath made Raja Bahadur, C.S.I., worked in colonial government.
- 1875 Accession of junior Raja Jogendranath (brother of Chandranath).
- 1897 Many rajbari buildings ruined by earthquake.
- 1902 Accession of junior Raja Birendranath (grandson of Jogendranath).
- 1925 Accession of senior Raja Jagindranath (son of Jagadindranath).
- 1947 Partition of India. Natore royal families abandoned their property in East Pakistan.
- 1950 Abolition of Zamindari estates in East Bengal, Pakistan.

Sources: A Short History of Natore Raj, District Gazetteer, Doctoral Thesis by S.M. Rabiul Karim

== Photographs: current ==
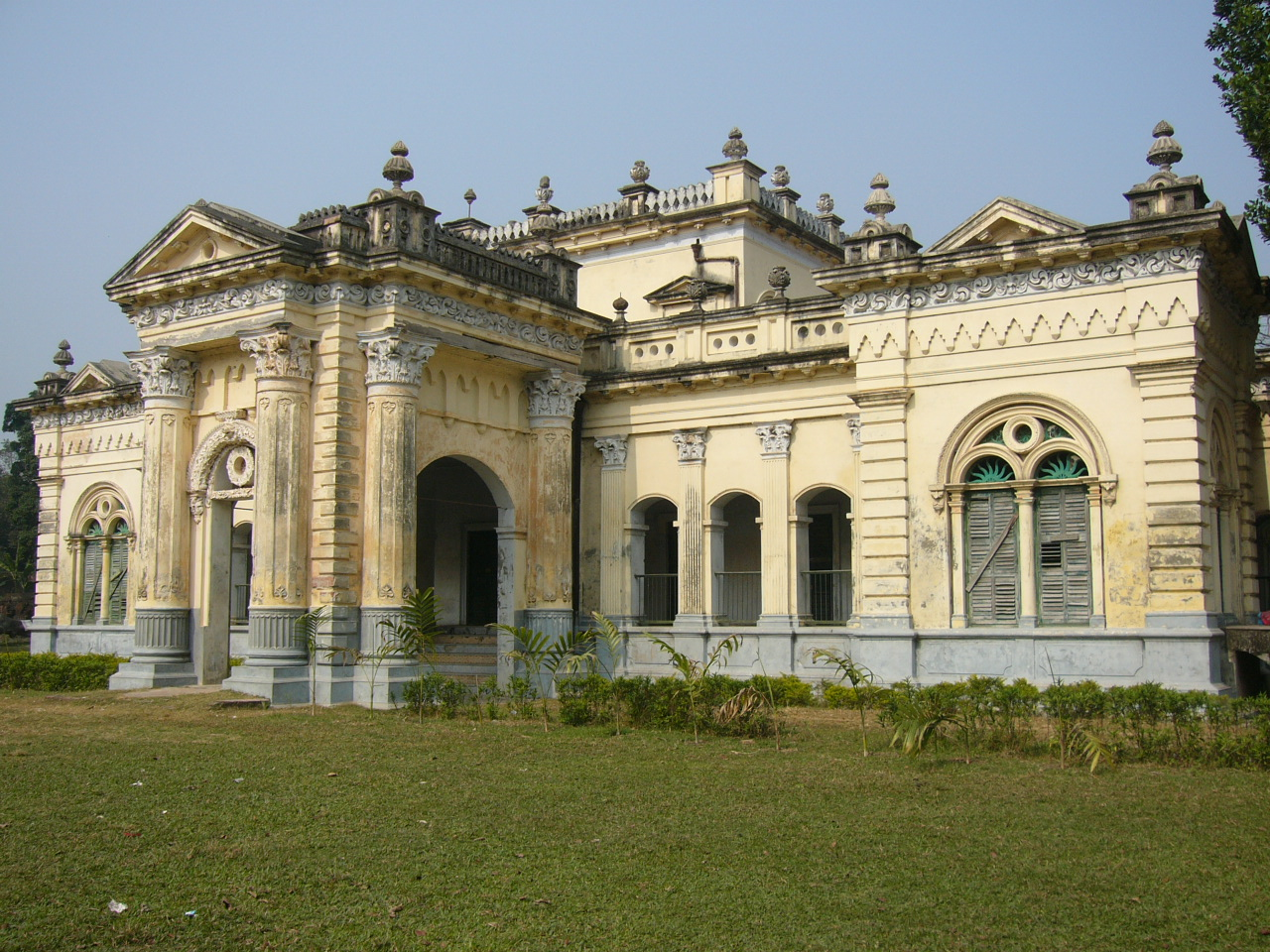
Rajbari (Senior Branch palace)

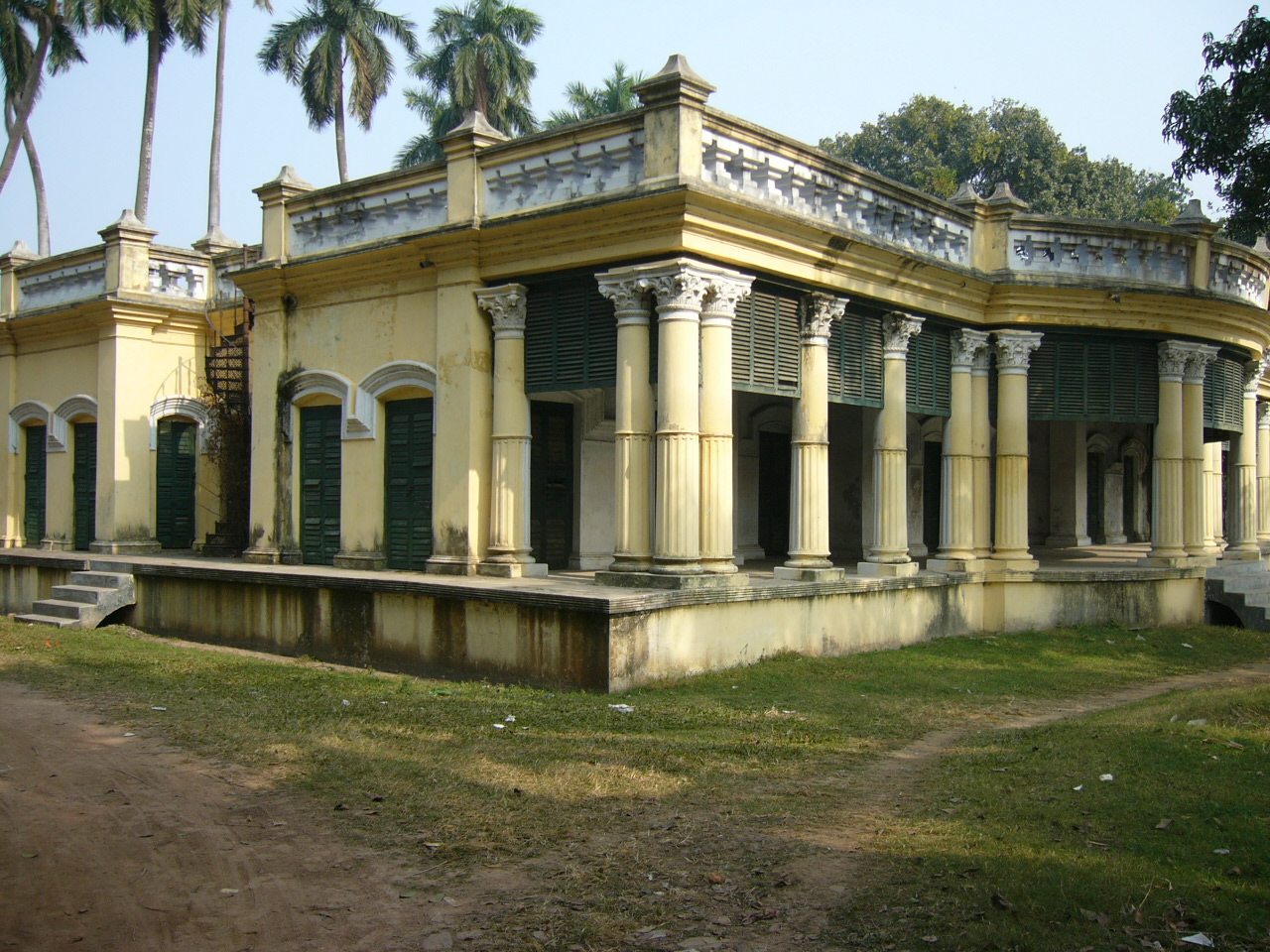
Rajbari (side view)

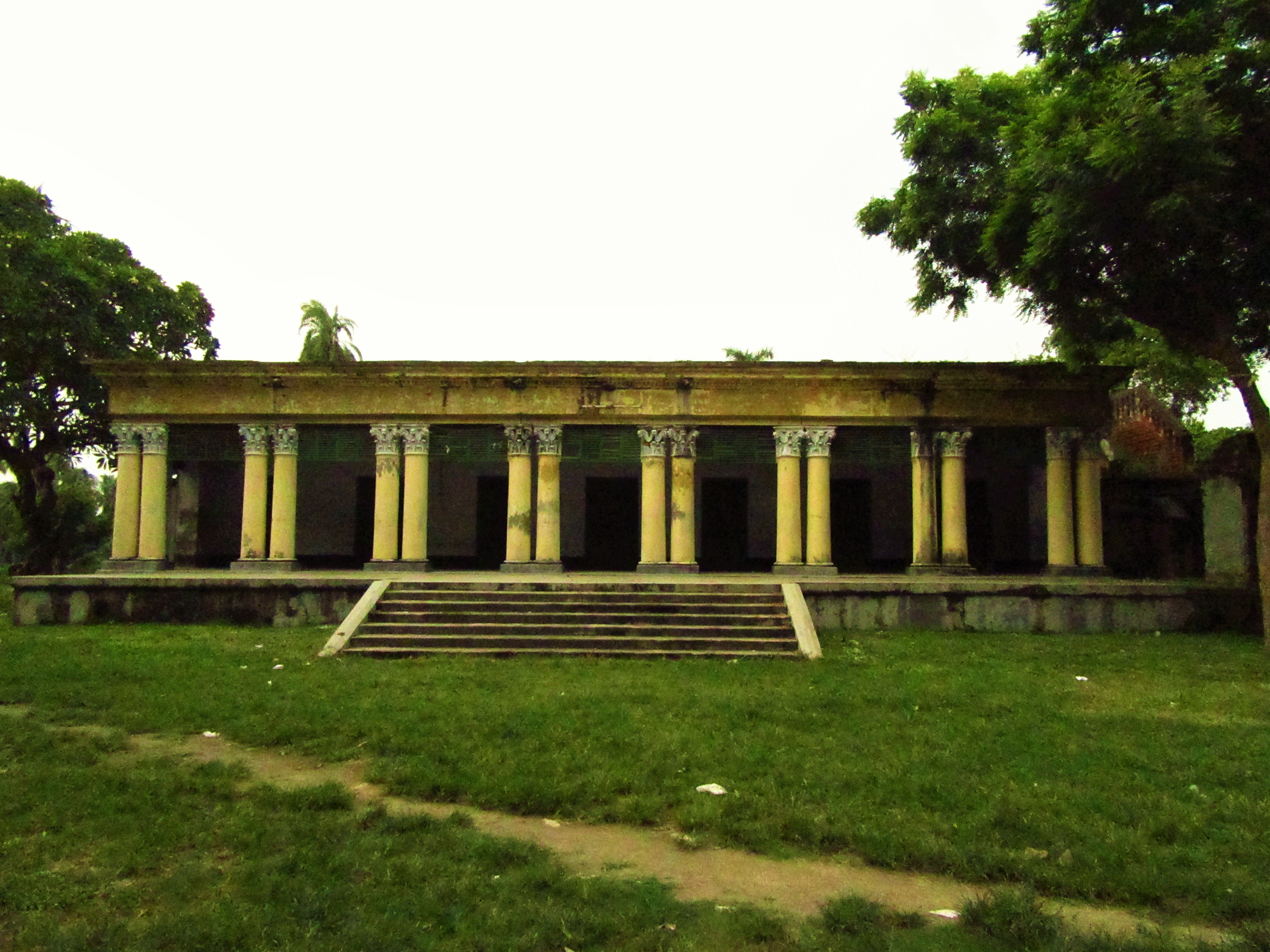
Honey Queen Building

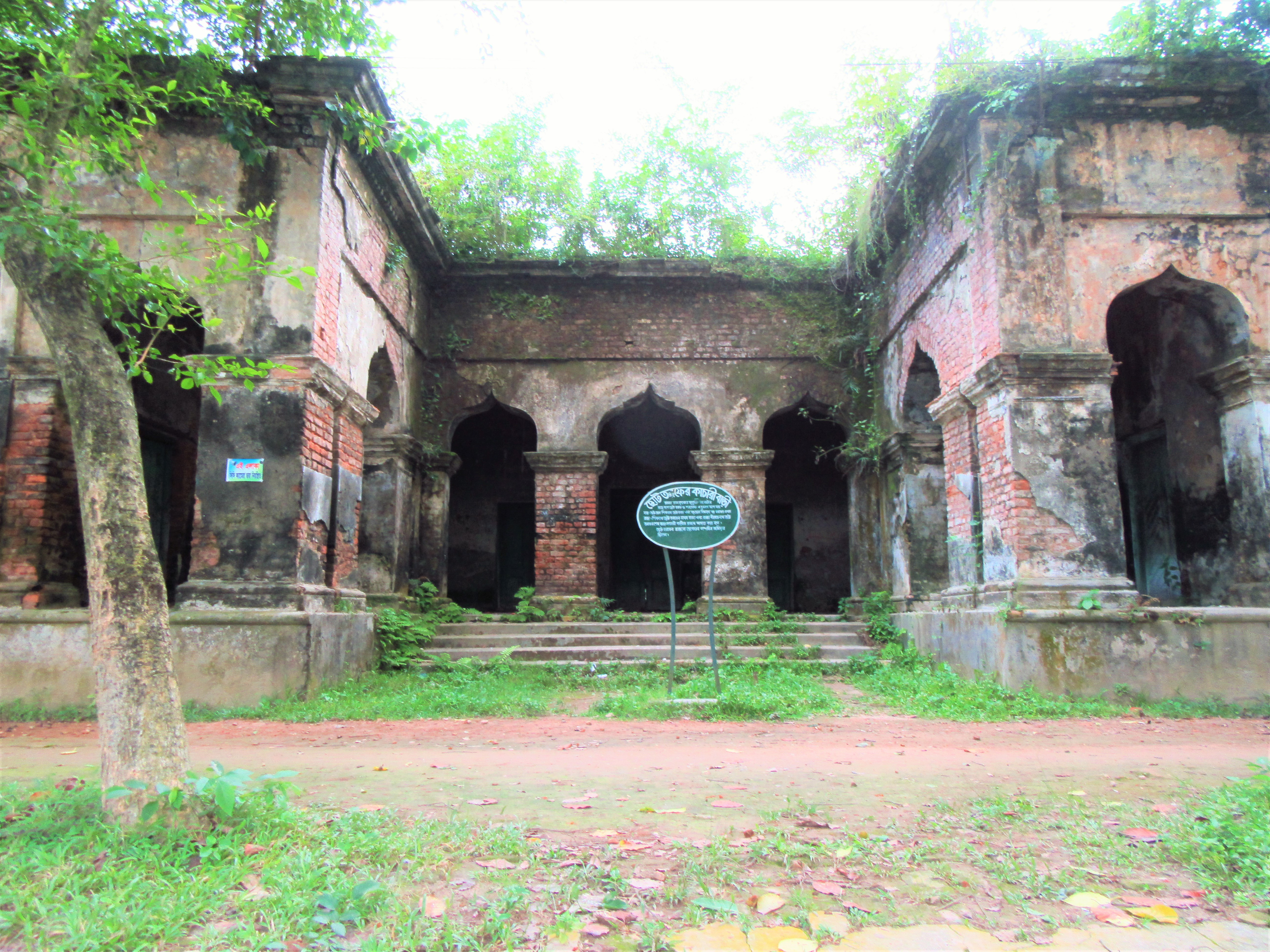
Rajbari Junior Branch Office Building

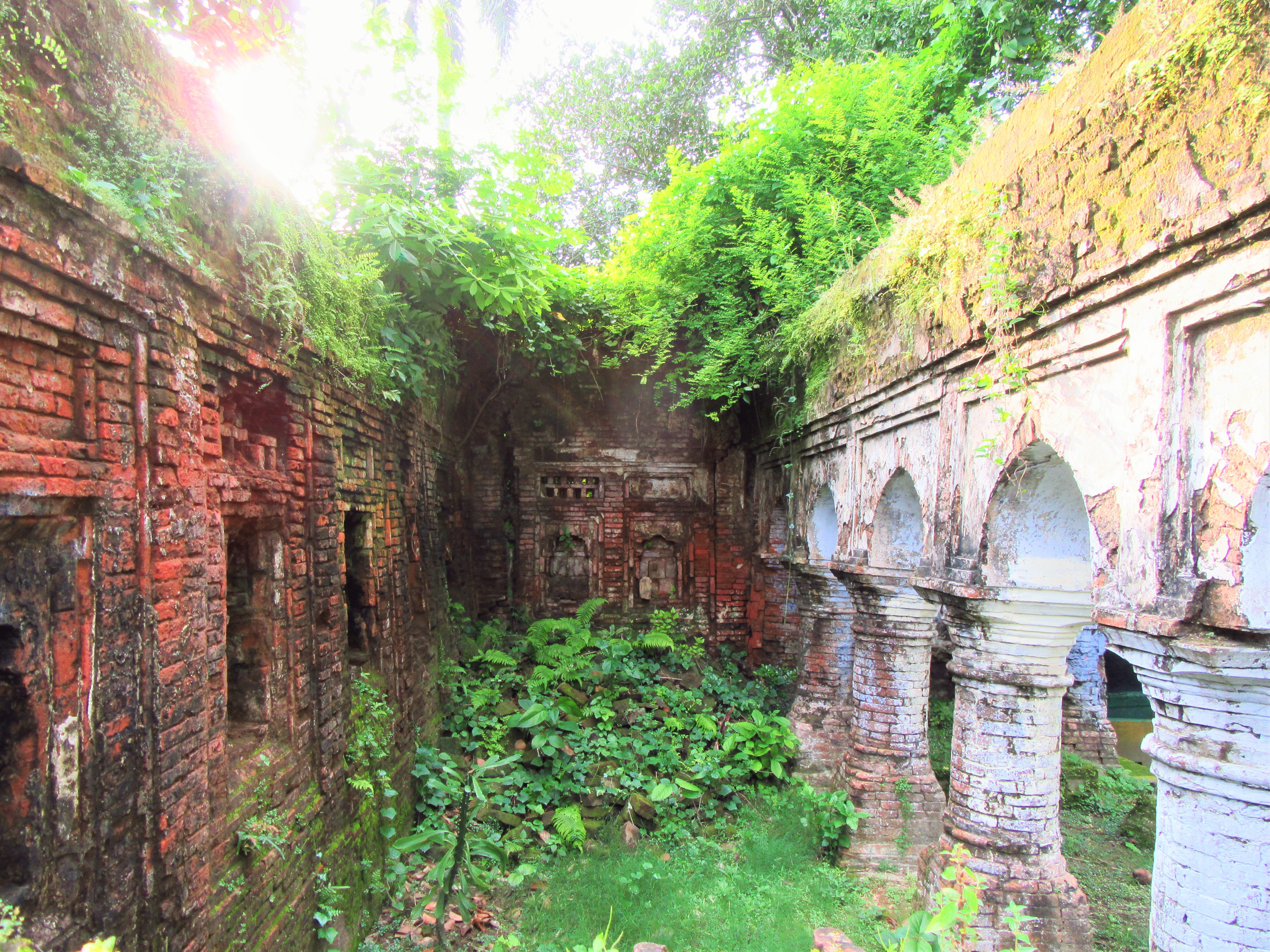
Ruins of palace yard

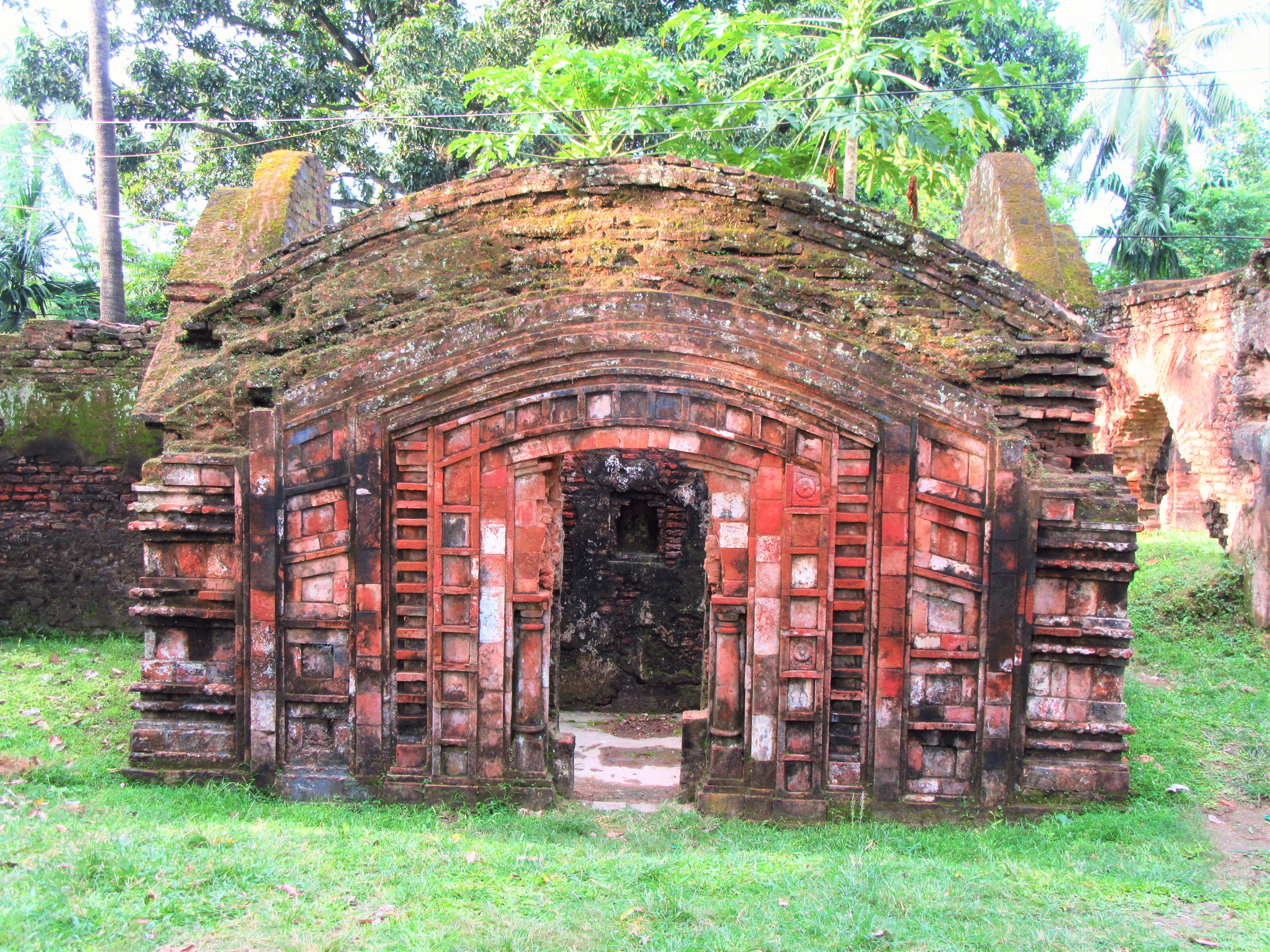
Ruined temple building

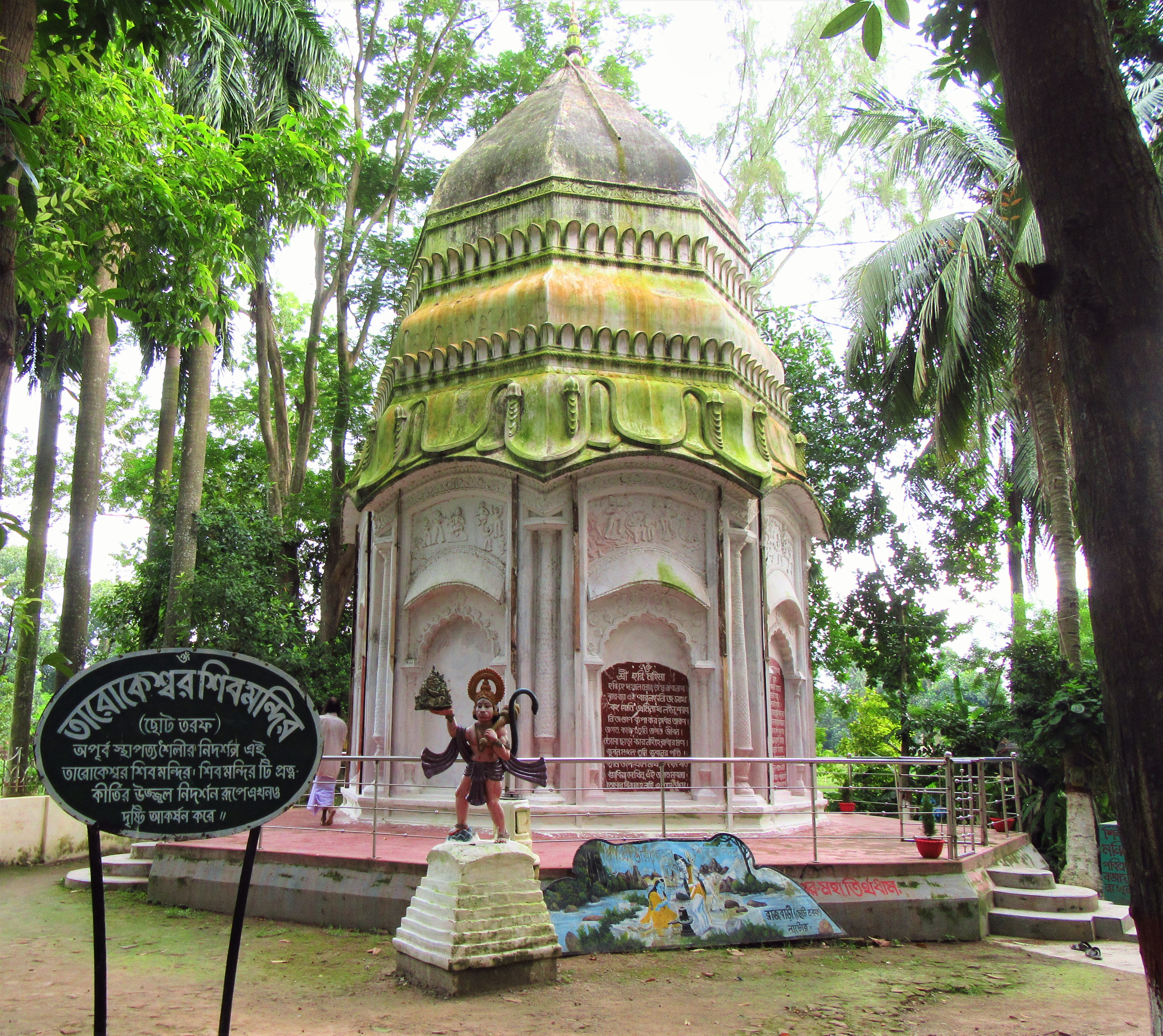
Tarokeshwar Shiva Mandir

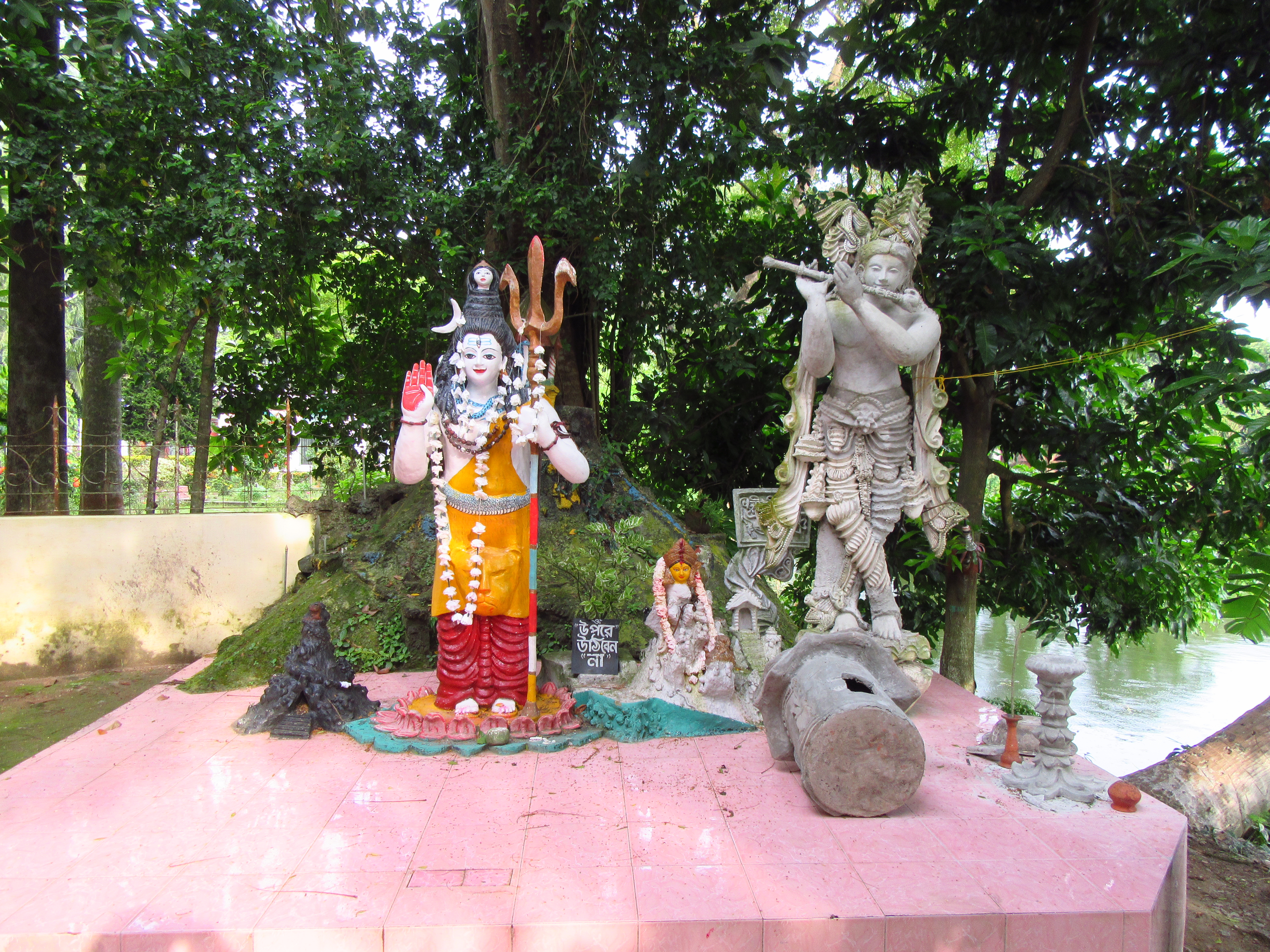
Figures outside Shiva Mandir

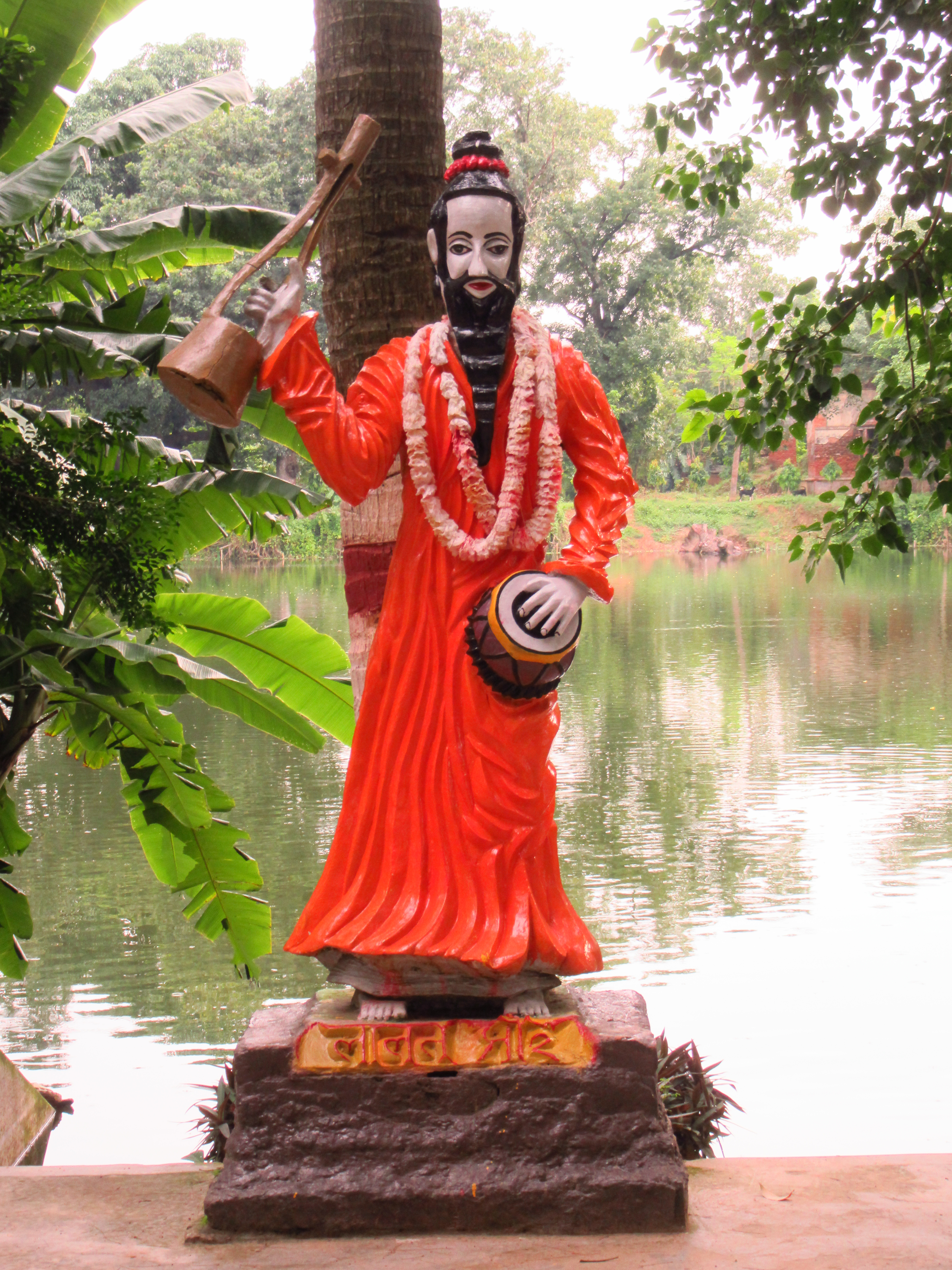
Figure of Baul Poet Lalon Shah

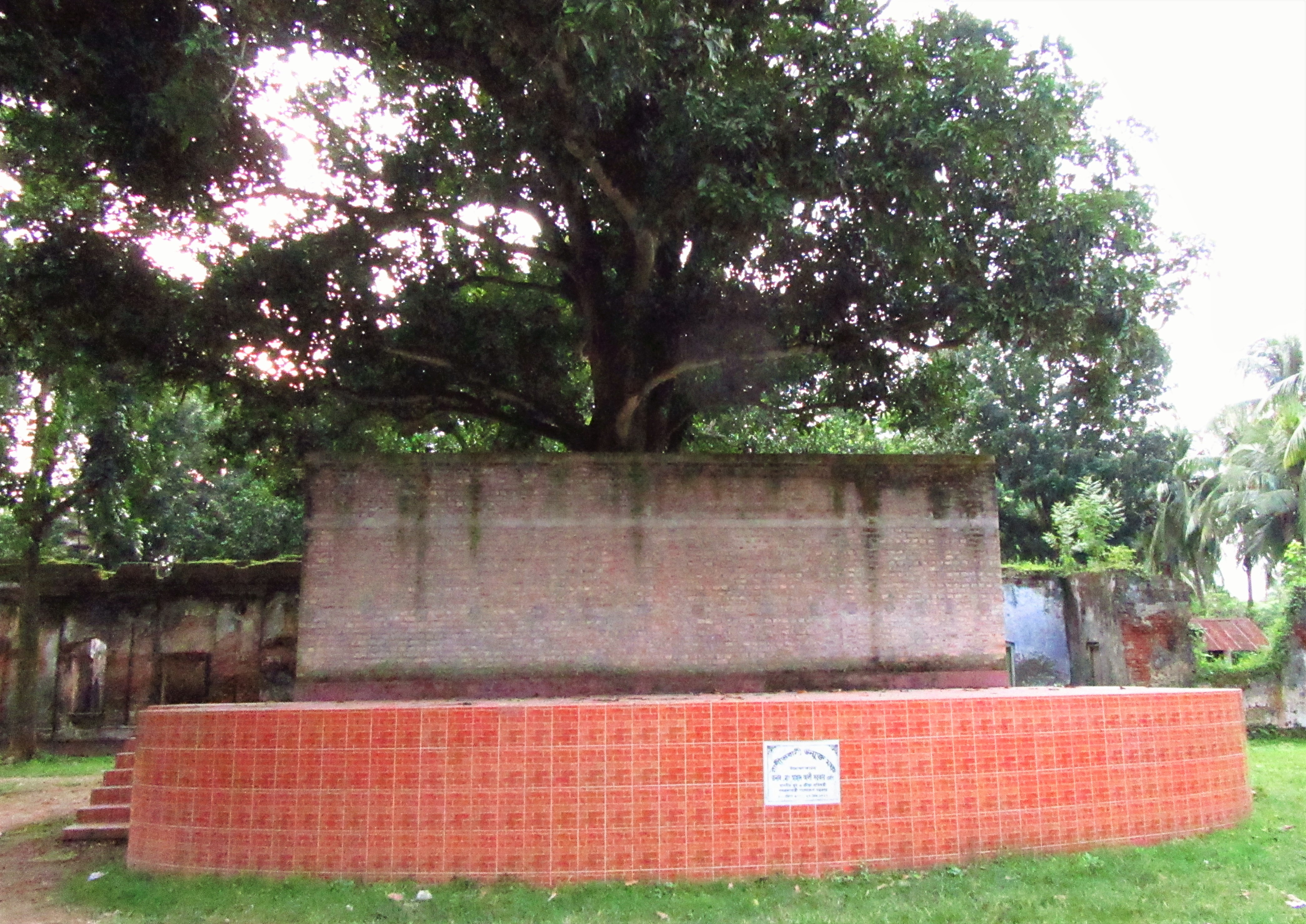
Rani Bhabani Open Air Stage

== Photographs: archival ==
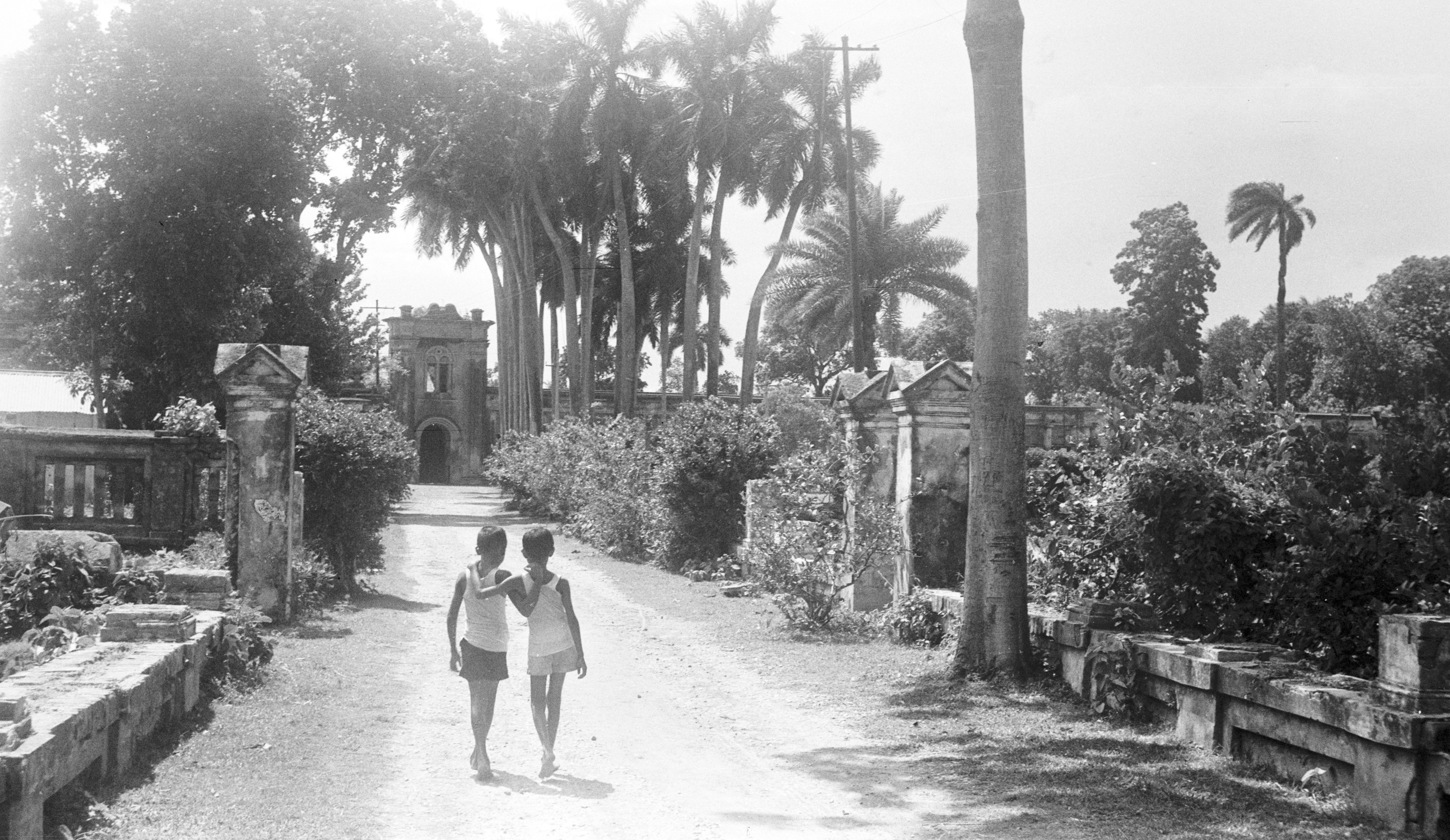
Rajbari approach avenue (1975)

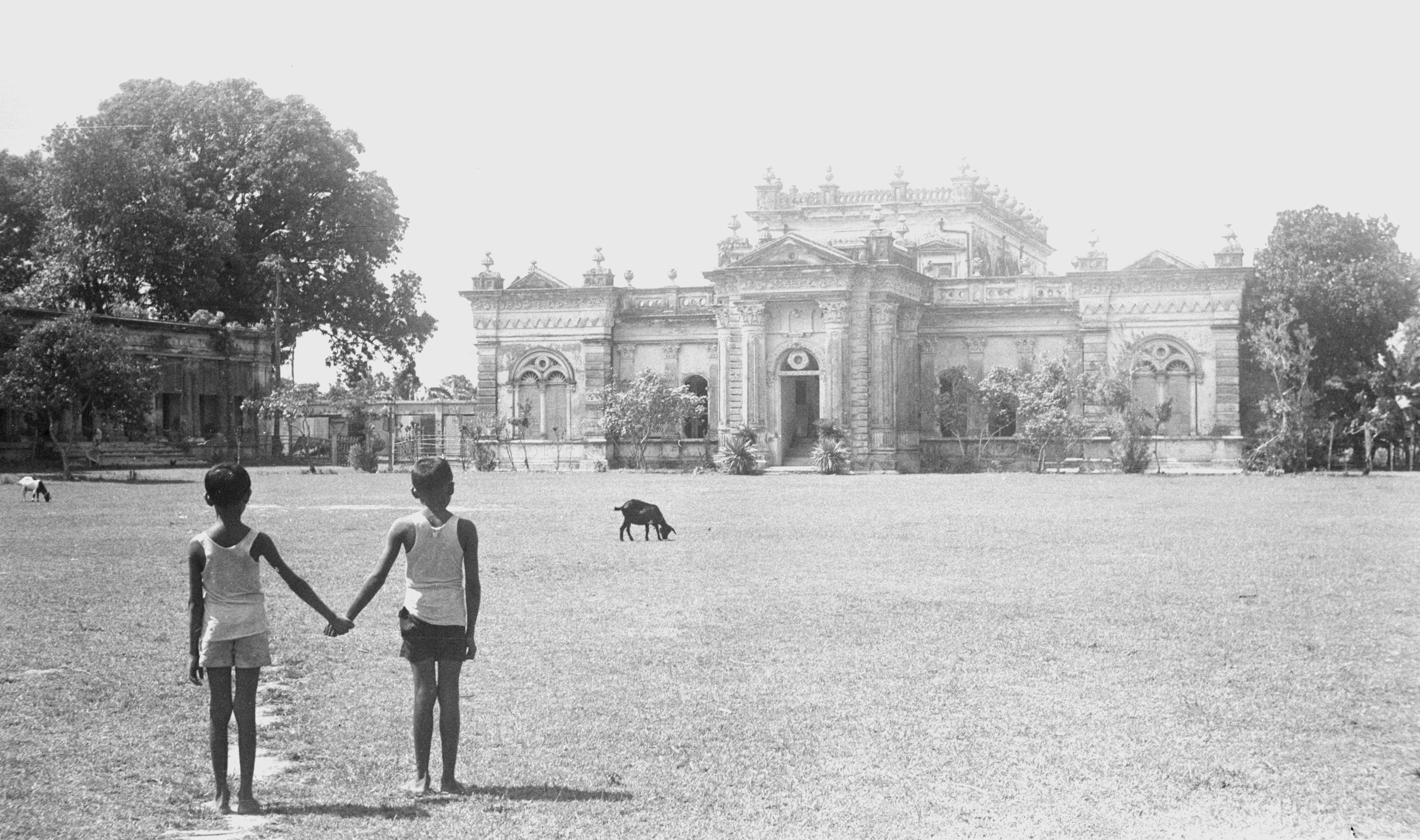
Rajbari senior palace (1975)

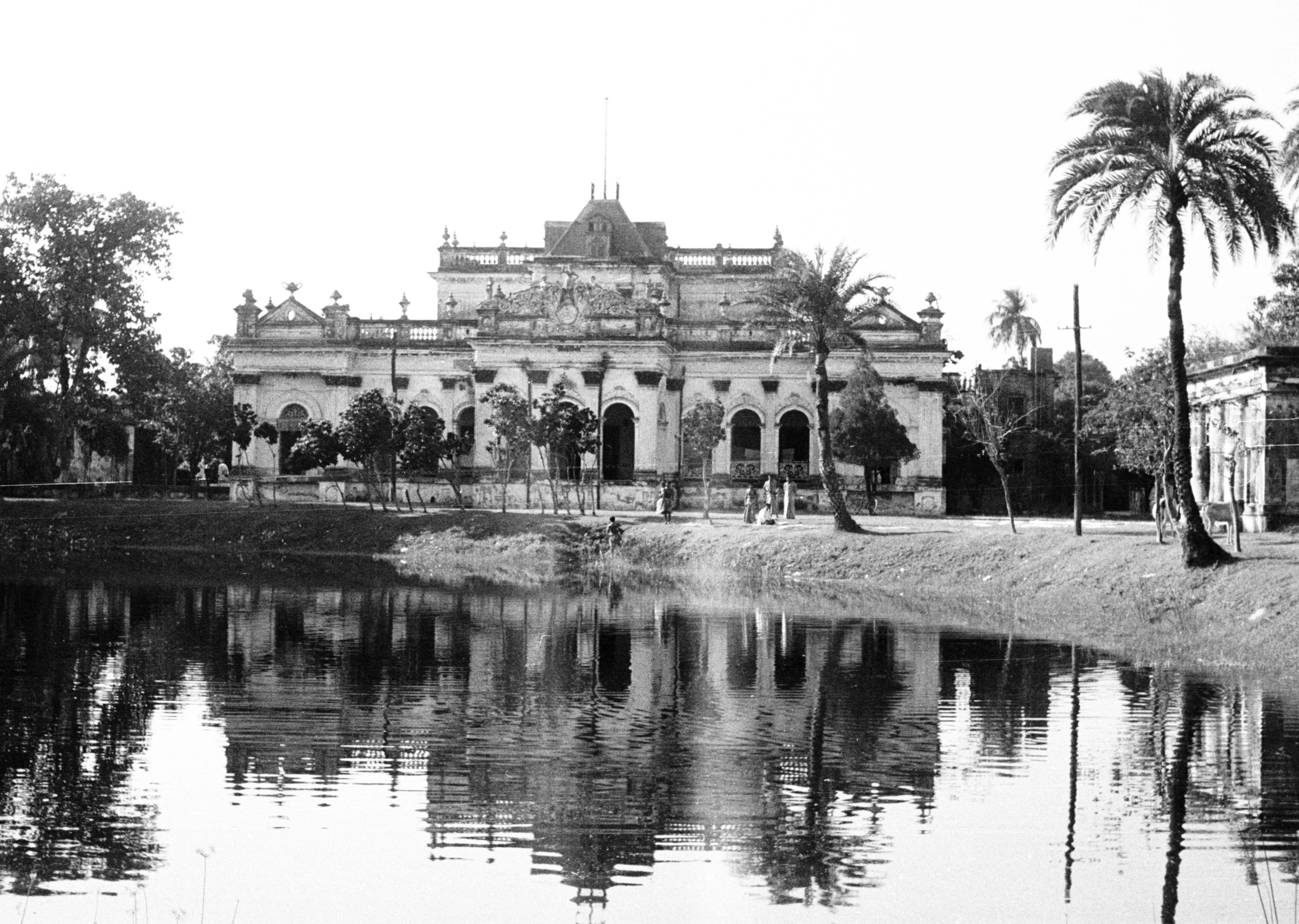
Rajbari junior palace (1967)

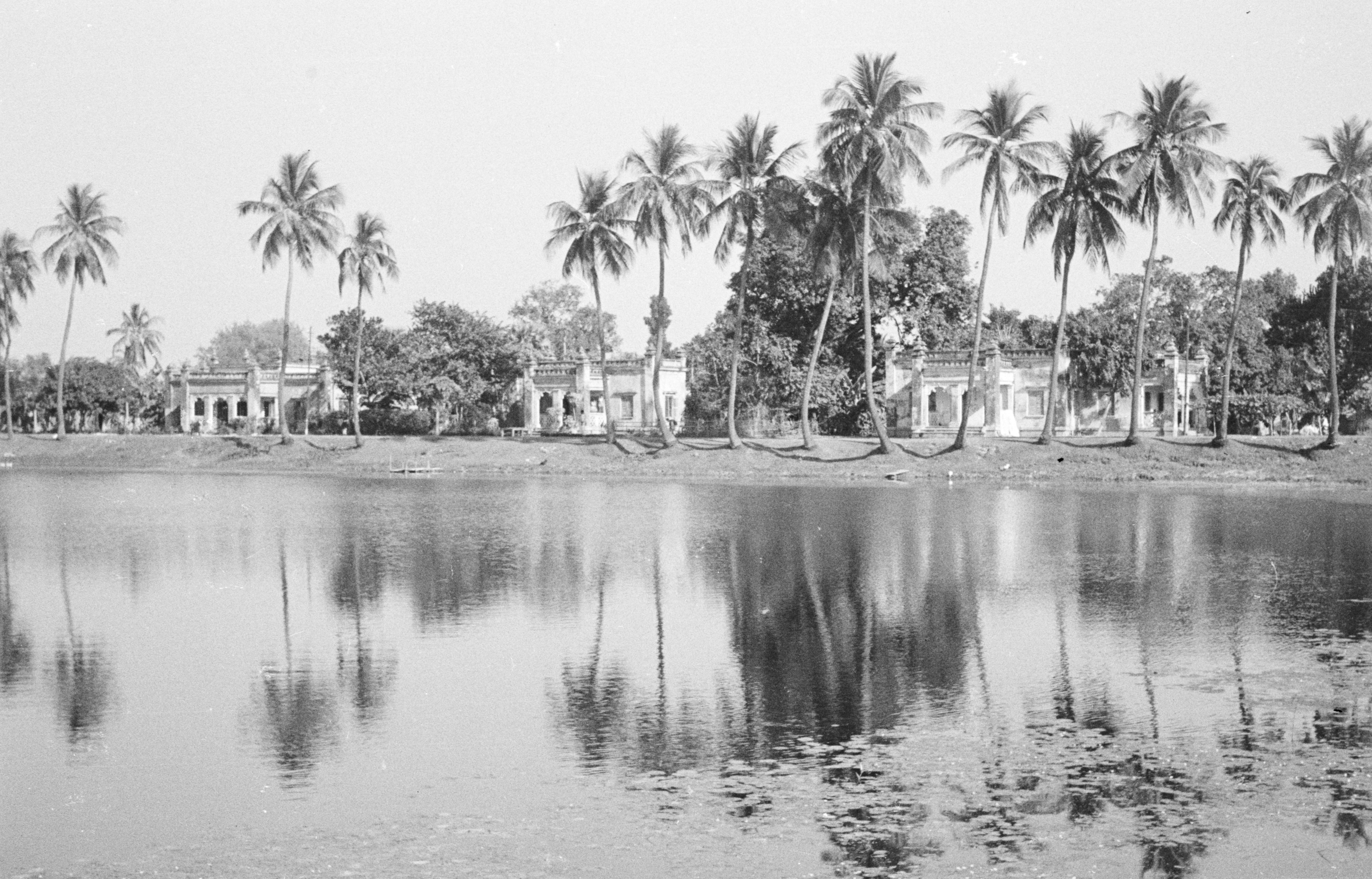
Lake in rajbari compound (1967)

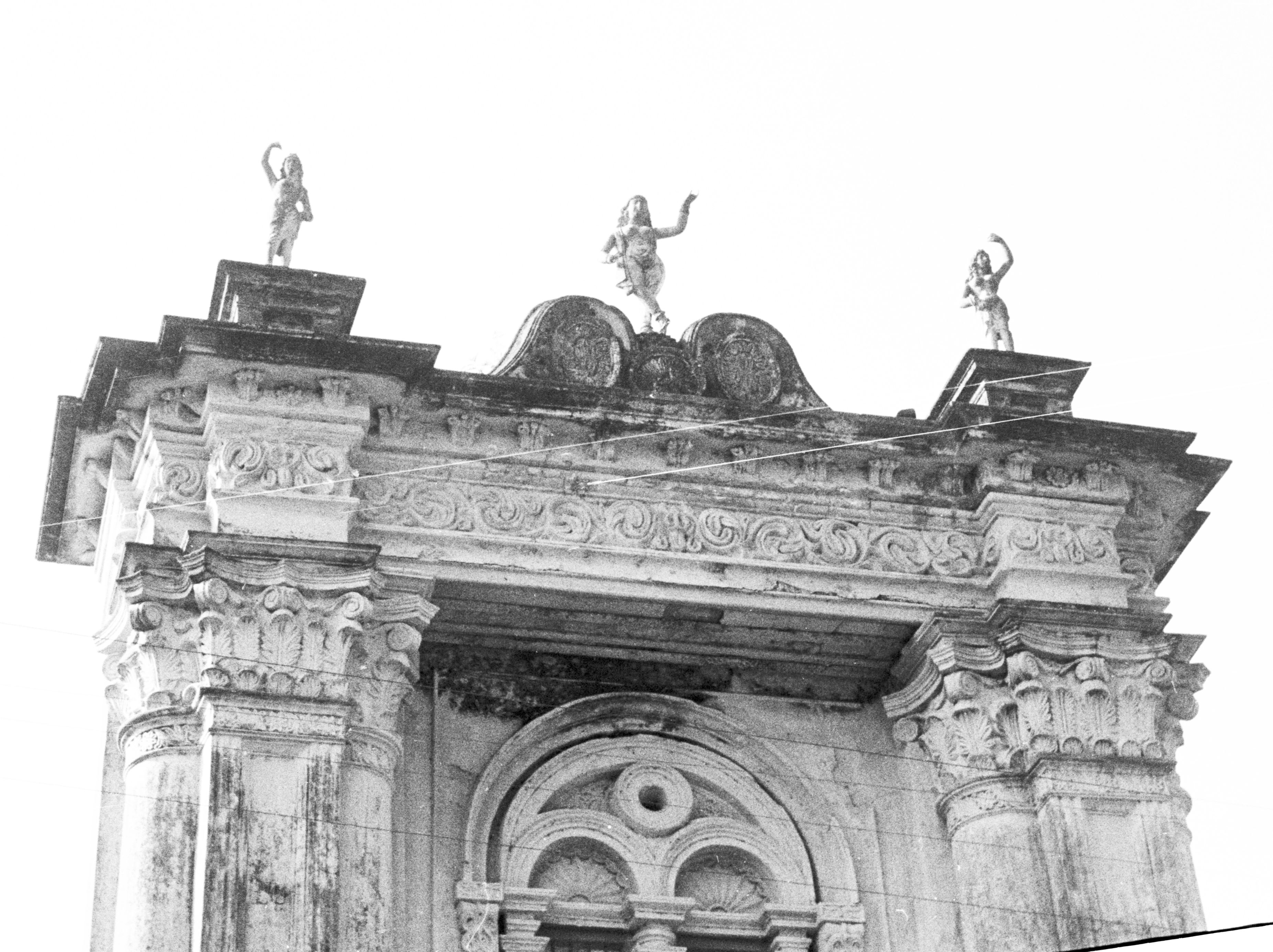
Archway of temple compound (1975)

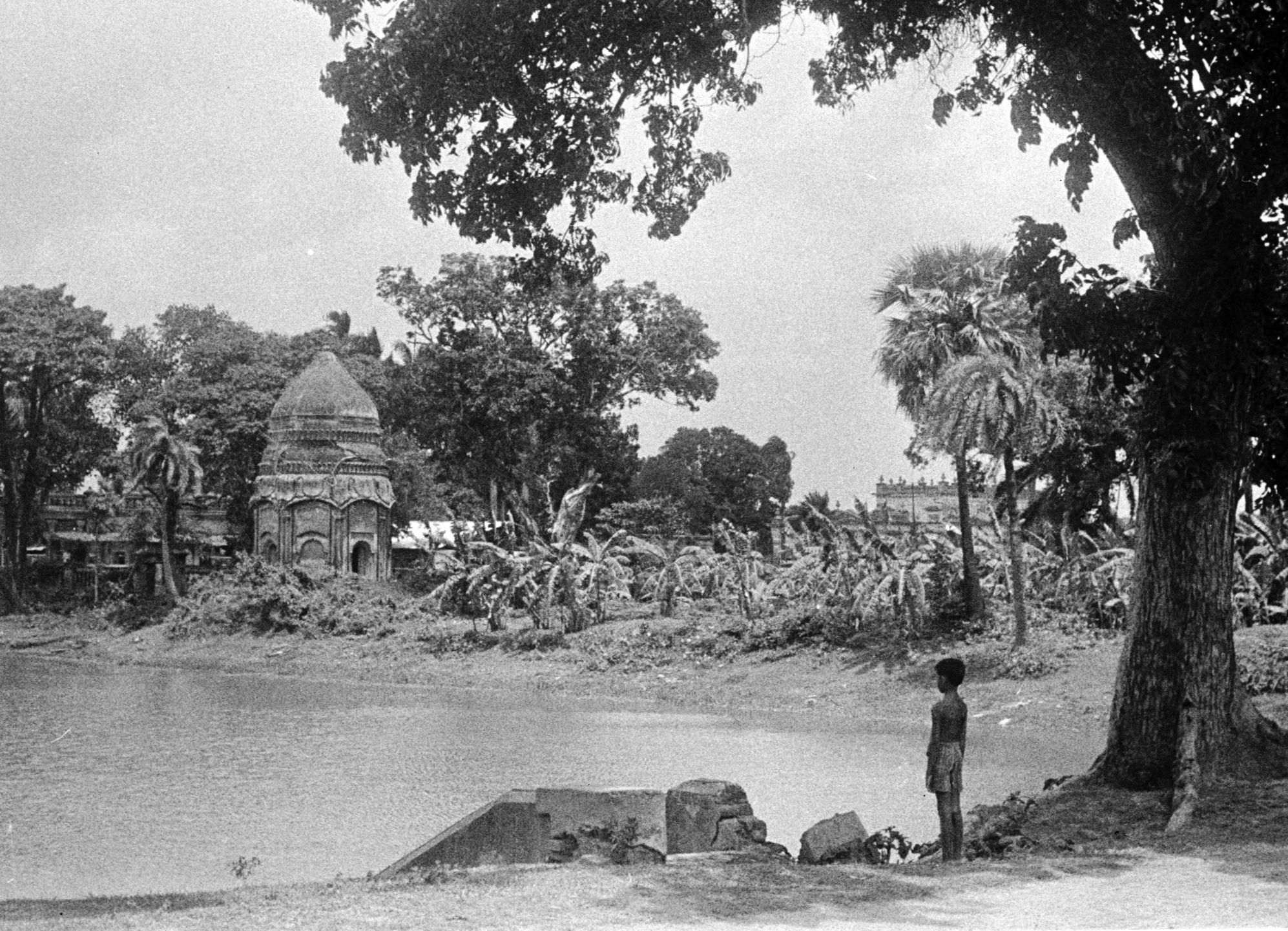
Lake and Shiva temple (1975)

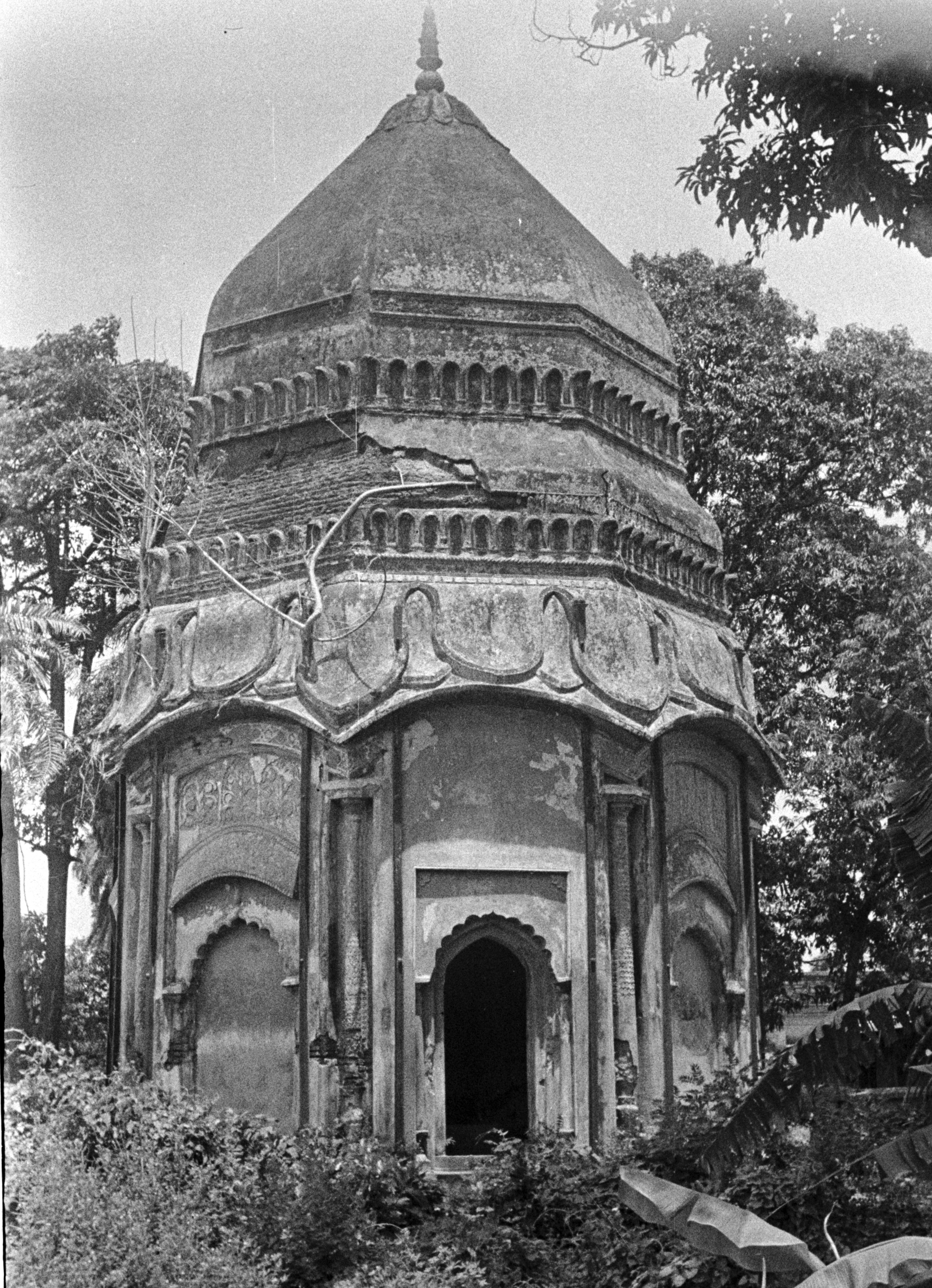
Tarokeshwar Shiva Mandir (1975)

== See also ==
- Puthia Rajbari
- Dighapatia Raj
- Uttara Ganabhaban
- List of Palaces
- Tajhat Palace
- Ahsan Manzil
- List of archaeological sites in Bangladesh
