= Rani Bhabani =

Bengali zamindar

- Rani of Natore; Ardhabangeshwari
- Reign: 1748–1803
- Predecessor: Raja Ramkanta Moitra
- Successor: Raja Ramkrisna
- Born: 1716; Bogra, Bengal Subah
- Died: 1803; Natore, Bengal Presidency, British India
- Spouse: Raja Ramkanta Moitra
- Issue: Tara
- Father: Atmaram Choudhury
- Religion: Hinduism
- Occupation: Zamindar

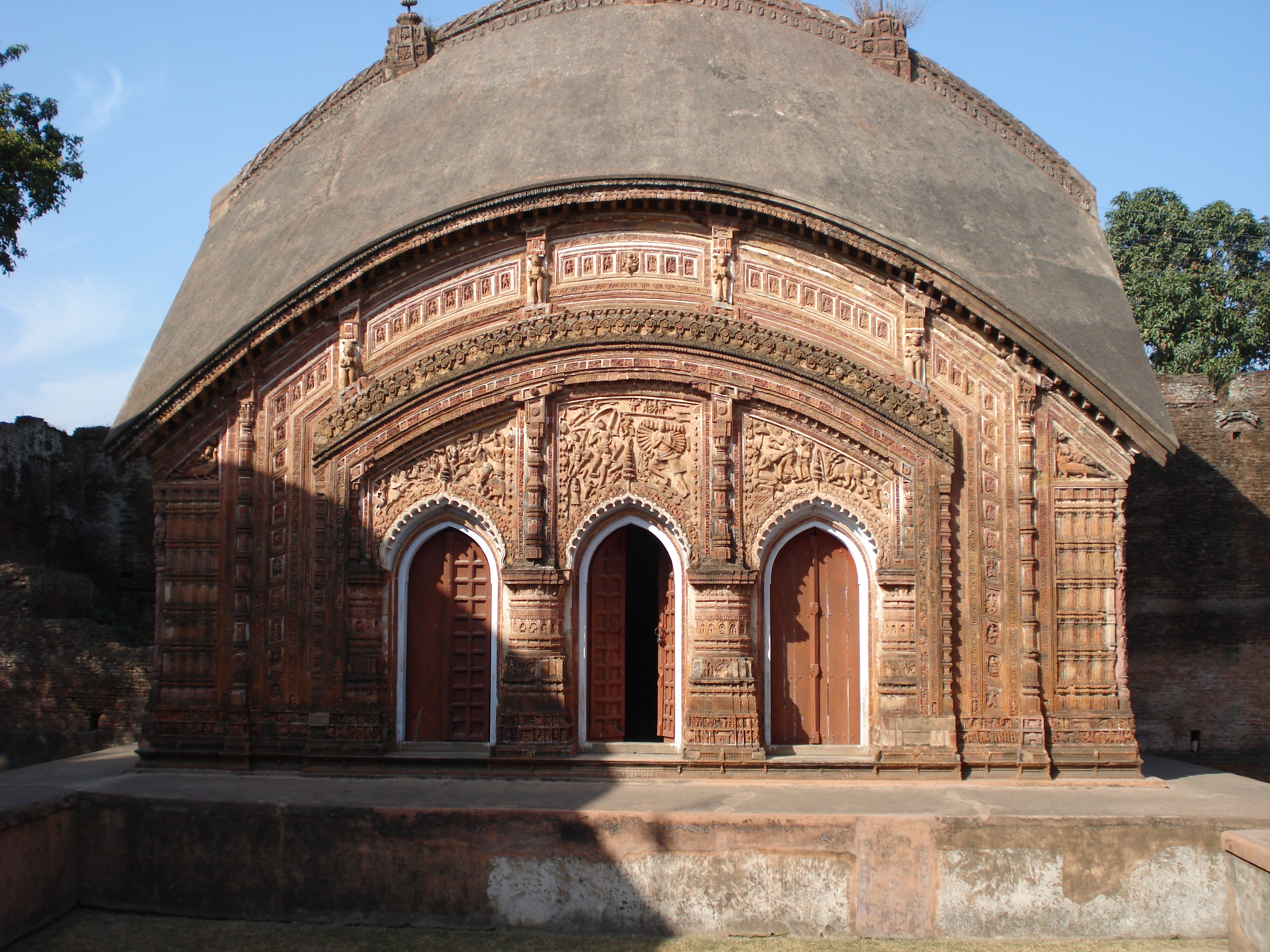
Char Bangla Temple in Baranagar, Murshidabad built by Rani Bhabani

Rani Bhabani (Bengali: রাণী ভবাণী; c. 1716–1803), also known as Ardhabangeshwari (অর্ধবঙ্গেশ্বরী) and Natorer Rani or the Queen of Natore, was a Hindu zamindar during the British colonial era in what is now Rajshahi, Bangladesh. She became the zamindar after the death of her husband Raja Ramkanta Moitra (Ray), Zamindar of Natore estate. She fought against Siraj-ud-Daulah, the Nawab of Bengal.

The Rajshahi Raj or Natore estate was the largest zamindari which occupied a vast position of Bengal. The Natore estate had an area of nearly 32,970 square kilometres (12,731 sq mi) and included not only much of North Bengal but also large parts of the areas later comprising the administrative districts of Murshidabad, Nadia, Jessore, Birbhum and Burdwan. After the death of her husband, Rani Bhabani expanded both the estate and the palace.

== Biography ==
Born in 1716 in a Bengali Brahmin family of Chhatimgram village, Bogra District, her father's name was Atmaram Choudhury, a landlord of Chatin village in Bogra district, now in Bangladesh. Bhabani was married off to Raja Ramkanta Moitra (Ray), the then zamindar of Rajshahi. After his death in 1748, Bhabani became the de jure zamindar, and started being referred to as Rani, or queen. A woman as a zamindar was extremely rare in those days, but Rani Bhabani managed the vast Rajshahi zamindari so efficiently and effectively for over four decades, that the annual income from land exceeded 15 million rupees of which 7 million rupees was paid to the state and the rest was utilised for building public utilities and supporting the needy.

After becoming the zamindar, she recognised the need for a strong army to protect her state from the Nawab of Bengal Siraj ud-Daulah, who had a reputation of debauchery, and began to reform and reorganise her army. Her fears came true, and soon the Nawab sent a messenger demanding her daughter Tara to satisfy his lust. When Rani Bhabani refused, the angry Nawab sent an army to abduct Tara, depose the Rani and loot the treasury. The Rani, herself leading her army, routed the Nawab's army and drove it out of her territories. The people of Natore also joined the Rani's army in the fight against the Nawab.

Bhabani resisted the attempts of the East India Company to integrate her estate into the tax farming system then current in Company-ruled Bengal. As historian Ranajit Guha explains, this enhanced her image among the people:

… the harassment caused to her by the East India Company and her manoeuvres to defy the fiscal pressure in a manner many other zamindars would not dare, were the stuff out of which popular imagination easily fashioned a legend of resistance and martyrdom. The fact of her being a woman made it convenient to fix upon her the image of the Mother, abused and insulted by foreigners and their lackeys, the nouveaux riches, and for a people unreconciled to British rule her suffering was charged with a dark, disturbing message.

Because of her resistance to the British, the wandering raiders from the northern provinces known as the Sannyasis and Fakirs who migrated to Bengal in this period turned to her for assistance or at least abetment. A leader of the Fakirs wrote a letter to Bhabani complaining of British oppression and calling her "the ruler of the country". One of the last measures that Bhabani took to defend her estate was to lease out parts of the zamindari to her son and other family members while in reality still controlling the lands.

Rani Bhabani's Palace, Natore Raibari, in Natore remains a major tourist attraction in Bangladesh to date.

Rani Bhabani died in 1803, at the age of 87, 46 years after the Battle of Plassey.

== Contributions and works ==
Rani Bhabani became a household name among the common people due to her philanthropy and general generosity, combined with an austere personal life. The number of temples, guesthouses and roads she constructed across Bengal is believed to be in the hundreds. She also built numerous water tanks, alleviating the acute water problem of her subjects. She built a road from Howrah to Varanasi, which is still in use today. She was also interested in the spread of education and donated generously to many educational institutes.

She tried to bring social reform by introducing widow remarriage in society but was unsuccessful. During the Great Bengal famine of 1770, she helped the poor by hiring eight vaidyas to help the people at her own expense.

In Baranagar, Murshidabad, from 1753 to 1760, she commissioned the building of 108 terracotta Shiva temples, with the aim of turning the place into a second Varanasi. Many of the temples are lost due to the changing course of the river. Among the surviving temples are the Char Bangla Temples.

She also made great contributions in Tarapith and Benaras. Tarapith, a Hindu Temple town situated in the Indian province of West Bengal is famous for (goddess Tara) & Hindu saint Bamakhepa. The Durga Kund Mandir in Varanasi was constructed by Rani Bhabani.

During the era of Rani Bhabani, she made some great contributions for the development and renovation of Bhabanipur temple. Bhabanipur is a Shakta pitha which is located at Sherpur Upazila of Bogra District.

== In popular culture ==
In Nabinchandra Sen's well-known poem Palasir Yuddha, Rani Bhabani's is unhistorically depicted as the leader of the anti-British aristocrats opposed to Mir Jafar's betrayal at the Battle of Plassey. In 1952, the biographical film Rani Bhabani, directed by B. Ratan Chatterjee, was released.
