= Saratsundari Devi =

Maharani Saratsundari Devi (1849-1886) was a queen and Bengali landed aristocrat of the Puthia Raj family based in the Rajshahi District of Bengal Presidency in British India (which now a part of Bangladesh).

== Background ==
The Puthia Raj family was established in Rajshahi by Mughal Emperor Jahangir in the early 17th century after the title was given to Nilambar. In 1744 the estate was partitioned among four brothers. The estate continued united it was abolished in 1950 in East Pakistan by the government of Pakistan.

== Biography ==
She assumed control of the Panchani estate in 1865 and carried out the management of the estate with great skills. She gained some renown for her philanthropic activities and was popular among her subjects. In 1874 the British Raj awarded her the title Rani and two years later, in 1877 the British Raj awarded her the title of Maharani.

In 1883, after the death of her adopted son, Jatindra Narayan Roy, her daughter-in-law, Hemanta Kumari Devi, was awarded the will and took over the estate. Hemanta Kumari was a notable philanthropist as well.

== Death ==
Saratsundari Devi died in 1886 in Kashi, when she was 37 years old.
