= Dhopkol =

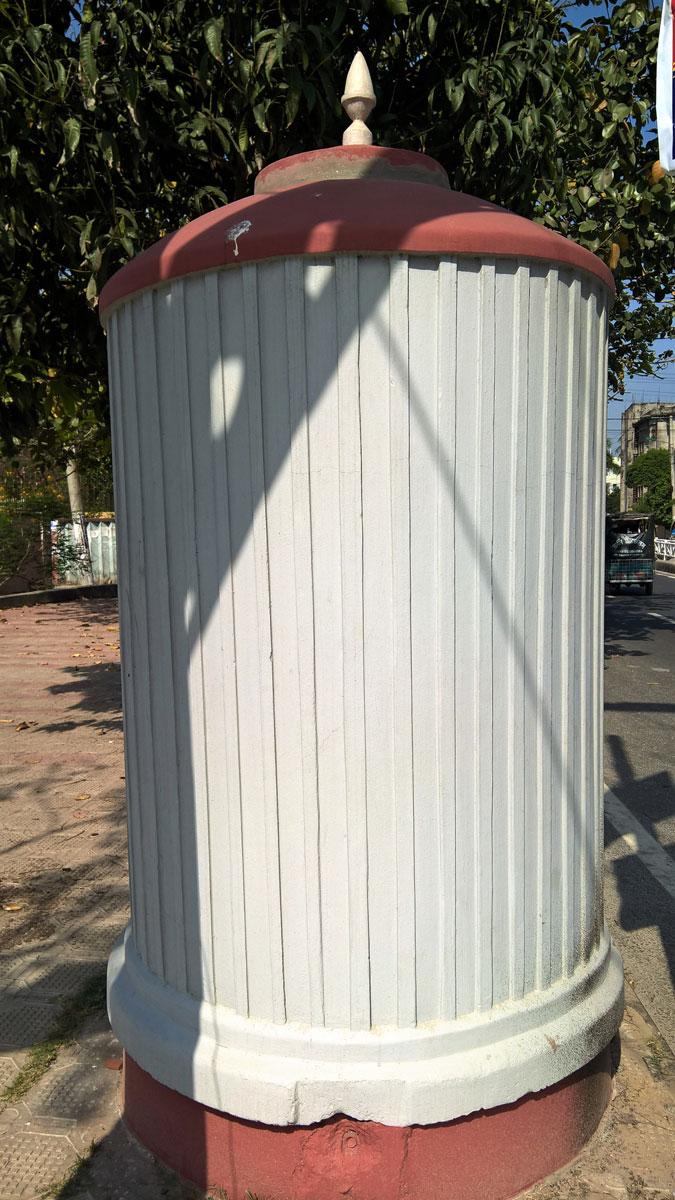
- A Dhopkol located in the Kazipara area of the Rajshahi city
- Former names: Maharani Hemanta Kumari Water Works

General information
- Location: Rajshahi, Bangladesh
- Construction started: 1934
- Completed: 1937; 89 years ago
- Cost: 2,50,000 taka

Height
- Height: 12 ft (3.7 m)

Technical details
- Material: Cement, cast iron, brass

Design and construction
- Known for: Rajshahi’s traditional water supply system

Dhopkol is one of the oldest heritage sites in Rajshahi, closely tied to its culture, history, and traditions. Through the efforts and patronage of Maharani Hemanta Kumari, the Maharani Hemanta Kumari Water Works project was built in 1937 to provide the people of the city with a continuous supply of clean drinking water. The Dhopkol structures found throughout the city are among the significant remnants of this project.

== History ==
During the construction of the Dhopkol, the chairman of the Rajshahi Municipality (currently the Rajshahi City Corporation) was Rai D.N. Dasgupta. At that time, access to potable water in Rajshahi city was very limited, and there was an acute shortage of clean drinking water. This led to outbreaks of cholera, dysentery, and other waterborne illnesses, resulting in several fatalities.

Rai D.N. Dasgupta, during his tenure as chairman of Rajshahi Municipality (1934–39), took the initiative to provide the city's residents with clean drinking water, with assistance from the Rajshahi Association. It was decided that water fountains would be installed at street corners. In August 1937, under the administration of the Ministry of Calcutta, the Rajshahi Water Works was established as a water supply and purification center, at a cost of over 2.5 lakh takas. Wealthy locals were encouraged to support this project, leading Maharani Hemanta Kumari to donate around 65,000 takas. Due to this generous single donation, the Water Works was established on land provided by the Rajshahi District Board and named after Maharani Hemanta Kumari. Over time, it became commonly known as Hemanta Kumari Dhopkol.

== Management ==
Around a hundred Dhopkols were installed throughout the city. At the Maharani Hemanta Kumari water purification plant, water was treated to remove iron and alkalinity before it was supplied to these Dhopkols. Initially, the water was filtered using a layer of stone. It was then distributed to various areas through thick cement pipes.

Each Dhopkol had a water holding capacity of 470 gallons. They were equipped with a "roughing filter," and the layered sand and stone allowed the water to be further purified before reaching the public. During summer, the water stayed relatively cool. In those days, water was supplied for only two hours a day, but it was stored in the Dhopkols, ensuring availability throughout the day.

Every two months, the Dhopkols would undergo thorough cleaning. The covers could be opened, allowing workers to enter and clean them with bleaching powder and other materials. Every two months, water samples from each Dhopkol were collected and sent to a laboratory to check for quality. Currently, most Dhopkols are no longer operational; only a few, like the one in Kumarpara, remain as a reminder of the city's heritage.

== Construction technique ==
The Dhopkols stand approximately 12 feet tall with a diameter of around 4 feet. They were built using cement casting. The outer surface of each Dhopkol has a wavy plaster design made using tin molds. A circular tin mold was created around the structure, filled with cement and brick fragments, making the structure highly durable and resistant to external damage.

== See also ==
- Akshay Kumar Maitreya
- Varendra Research Museum
- Rajshahi College
