= Rajshahi Raj =

Moitra Royal Family

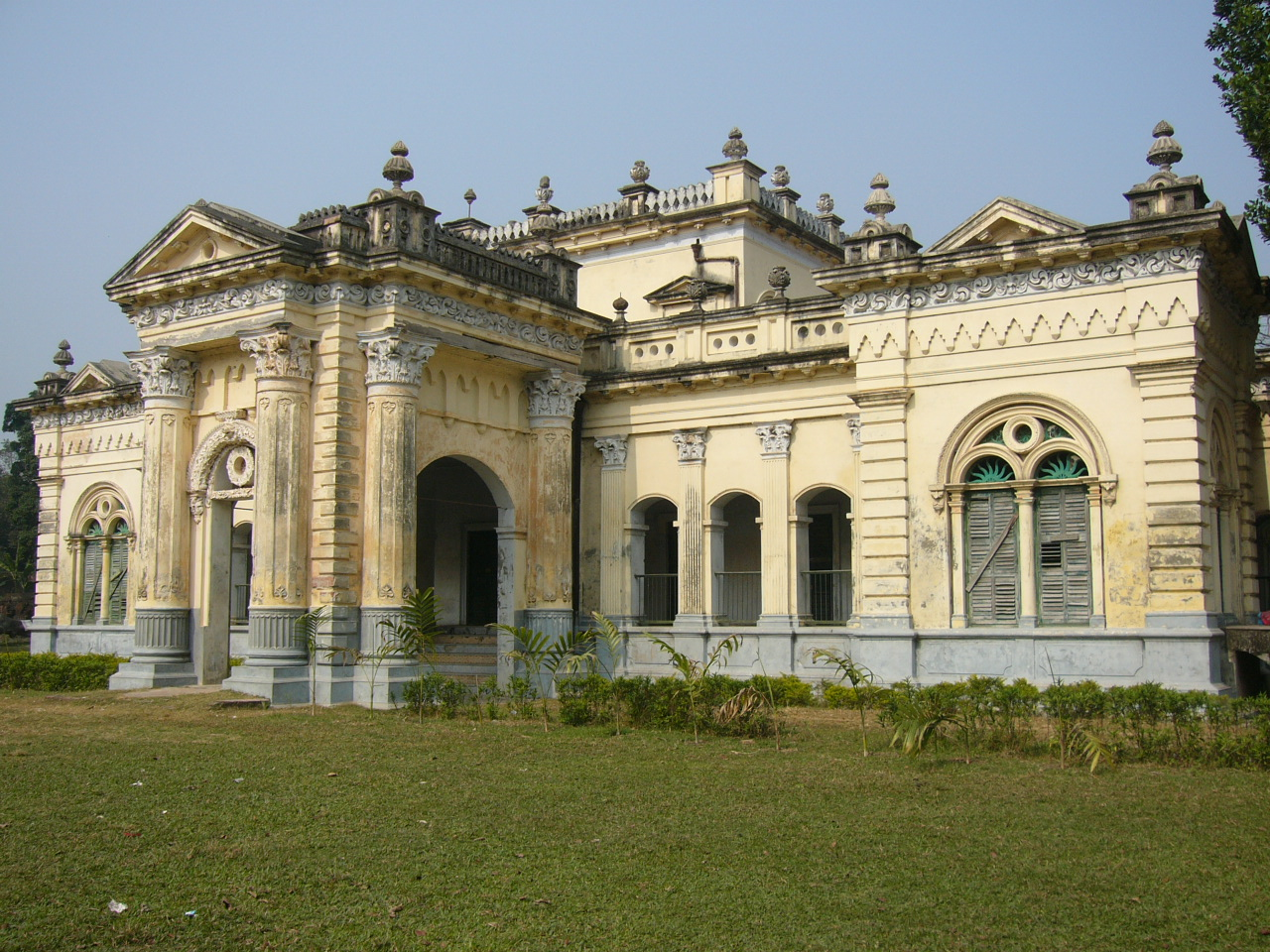
- The palace of Natore
- Parent family: Puthia Raj family
- Country: East Bengal
- Founded: 18th century
- Founder: Raja Kamdev
- Titles: Raja; Rai-Raiyan; Raja Bahadur; Rai Bahadur; Rai Sahib

Rajshahi Raj was the largest zamindari (feudatory kingdom) during the British Raj which occupied a vast position of Bengal (present-day Rajshahi Division, Bangladesh, and Bihar). The Royal Family of Rajshahi used the title Ray/Rai.

== History ==
Many old aristocrats and landlords lost their estates during the reign of the Nawab of Bengal, Murshid Quli Khan. Besides, many zamindars lost their zamindari on account of their disobedience and rebellion. Murshid Quli Khan settled these zamindaries with his trusted followers. In this process of replacement the most fortunate beneficiary was the Rajshahi zamindari. The family also benefited by another feature of nawab's revenue policy of encouragement to the formation of big zamindaries.

The Rajshahi Raj family traced its origin to Kamdev Rai, a tahsildar of the Puthia Raj family. Kamdev had three sons Ramjivan, Raghunandan and Bishnuram. Raghunandan was the very promising and enterprising. Raja Darpanarain, the zamindar of Puthia, and Murshid Quli Khan had significant contributions behind Raghunandan's rise to prominence. Raghunandan sided with Murshid Quli Khan in his entanglement with the Subahdar, the Prince Azim-us-Shan, the grandson of Emperor Aurangzeb and thus won the confidence of the nawab.

Again, when the diwani was transferred to Murshidabad, he was appointed in a similar capacity as his master's representative there. During this time he came in close contact of Murshid Quli Khan and secured his confidence. Which is why the naib (later ruler of Bengal) trusted him and let him set up the dynasty. Just a few zamindars controlled half of the total landed property of Bengal and in 1793 British East India company has abolished Nizamat (local rule by nawabs appointed y the Mughal emperor) and has taken complete control of the province of Bengal. The colonial state viewed these princely zamindaris as potential threats to the security of the new state, because their power were so great that they could at any opportune moment combine and put the colonial state in great jeopardy. Hence it became a policy of the government to weaken these estates, if not destroy them altogether. One of the strategies to implement this design was the ruthless operation of the sunset law (law which required the lords to submit their revenues by sunset). The family continued to rule from the natore palace.
