= Puthia Raj family =

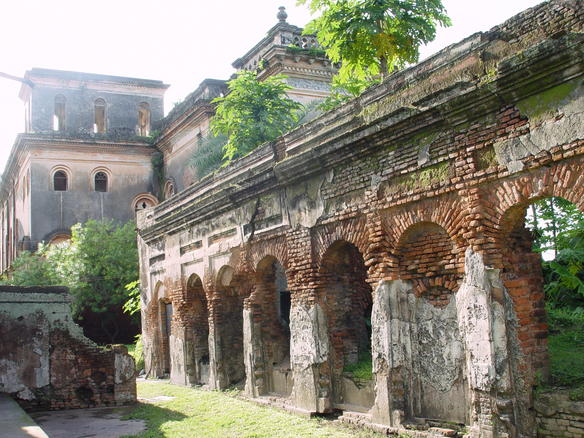
Ruins of the Old Palace

The Puthia Raj family was created by the Mughals in the early seventeenth century and is one of the oldest feudal estates of Bengal. A lord named Nilambar received the title of Raja (King) from the Emperor Jahangir (reigned 1605–1627 CE). In 1744, the region was divided between King Nilambar's sons and the Puthia Raj family was born. The family built lavish palaces and temples, such as the Puthia Temple Complex, and were noted philanthropists. Later the Puthia Raj estate was maintained by Lahiris until the abolition of the zamindari system under the newly formed democratic Government of East Pakistan after passing of the East Bengal State Acquisition and Tenancy Act of 1950, just two years after the fall of the British Raj. The palaces are currently administered by the Government of Bangladesh.

== Notable members ==
- Saratsundari Devi
- Hemanta Kumari Devi
