= Hemanta Kumari Debi =

Maharani Hemanta Kumari Devi
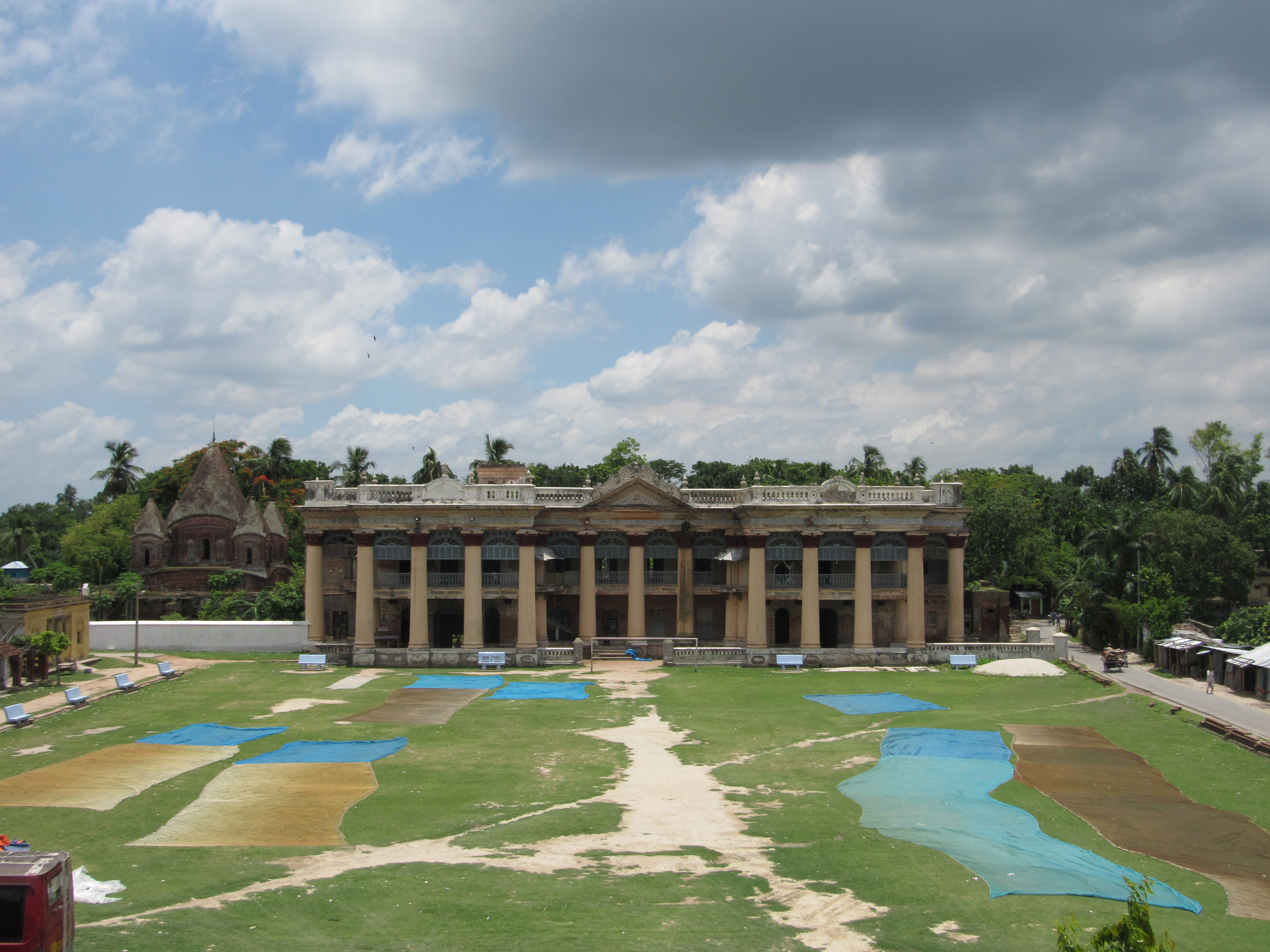
- Puthia Rajbari, the residence of Maharani Hemanta Kumari Devi
- Born: 1869; Manikganj District, Dhaka, Bengal Presidency, British India
- Died: 11 July 1942 (aged 72–73)
- Citizenship: Bangladesh
- Known for: Zamindar of Puthia
- Spouse: Jatindra Narayan

Maharani Hemanta Kumari Devi (1276 [Bengali calendar]; 1869 AD – 27 Asharh 1349 [Bengali calendar]; 11 July 1942 AD) was a Bengali philanthropist. She was born in Dhulla village, Manikganj district, Bangladesh. She is particularly remembered for her significant contributions to the development of Rajshahi city. For her philanthropic work, she was awarded the title of Maharani. While residing in Varanasi, she fell gravely ill and died.

== Personal life ==
Zamindar of Puthia Maharani Sharatsundari Devi's son, Jatindra Narayan, married Hemanta Kumari Devi, the daughter of prominent Dhaka district zamindar Bhuvanmohan Roy, in 1880. Due to unhealthy habits, Jatindra Narayan developed various illnesses and eventually died in 1883. Later, during her final years, Maharani Hemanta Kumari Devi's mother-in-law, Maharani Sharatsundari, became distressed by various issues and moved to Varanasi, India, where she died in 1886. Following these events, Hemanta Kumari Devi assumed responsibility for the Puthia zamindari at the young age of 18.

== Zamindari responsibility ==
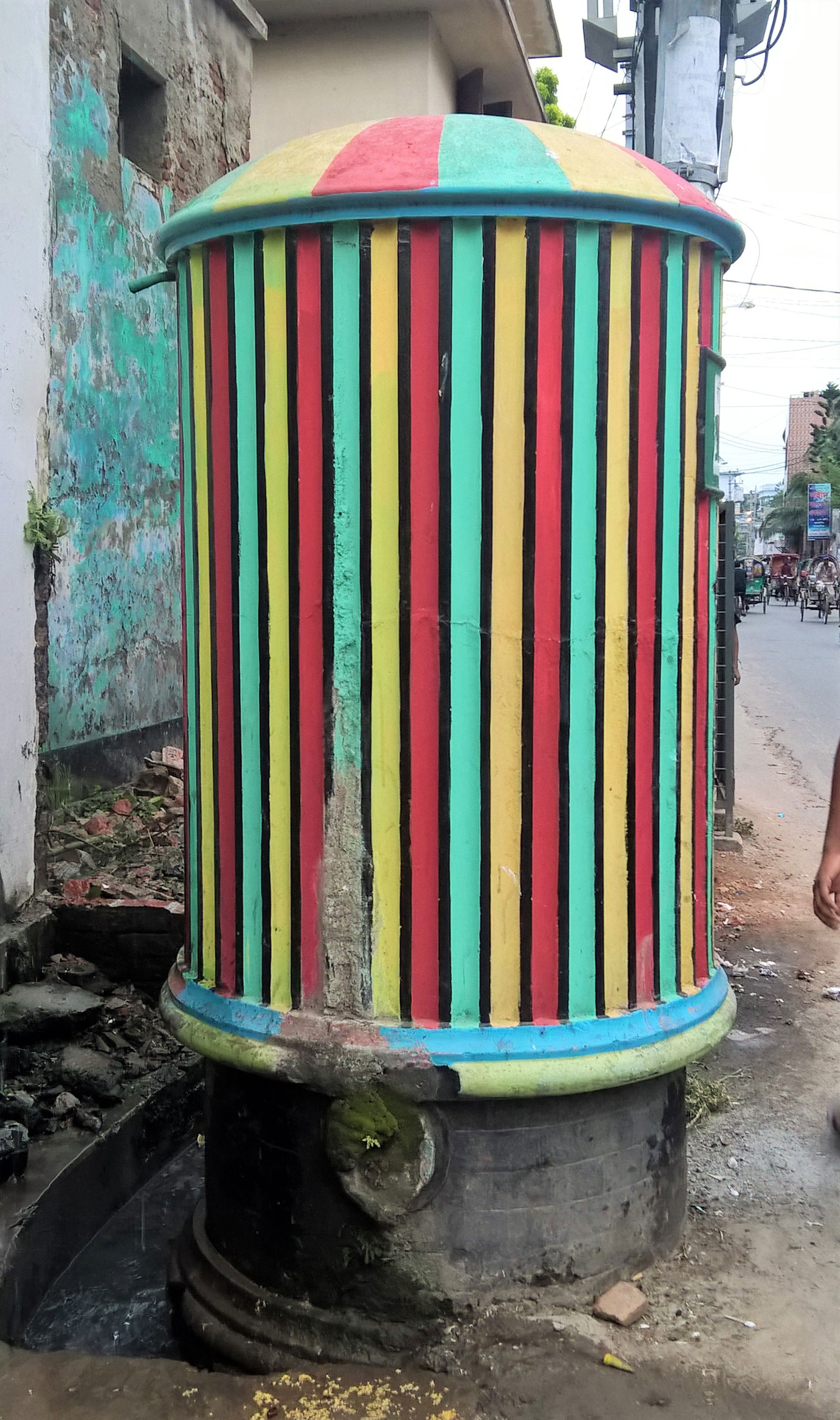
A Dhopkol located in the Kazipara area of the Rajshahi city

Taking advantage of Maharani Hemanta Kumari's youth, real control of the zamindari passed into the hands of her father, Bhuvanmohan, and her uncle, Bhairab Chandra. After Bhuvanmohan died in 1890, Bhairab Roy took over the responsibilities of the estate. In 1895, Maharani Hemanta Kumari's only daughter, Princess Surendra Bala, was married to Bishweshwar Sanyal. Unfortunately, Princess Surendra Bala died just 10 years after her marriage in 1905. For her numerous contributions, Maharani Hemanta Kumari was awarded the title of "Rani" during Lord Curzon's tenure in 1901, and later, in 1920, she was honored with the title of "Maharani" during Lord Chelmsford's period. Maharani Hemanta Kumari Devi died in 1942. In 1950, a nationwide movement against the zamindari system arose, leading to the dissolution of the Puthia royal family, similar to other regions, after the Maharani's death. She built the 'Maharani Hemanta Kumari Water Works' in 1937 to ensure a constant supply of pure water for the people of Rajshahi. It is now known as Dhopakal.

== Achievements ==
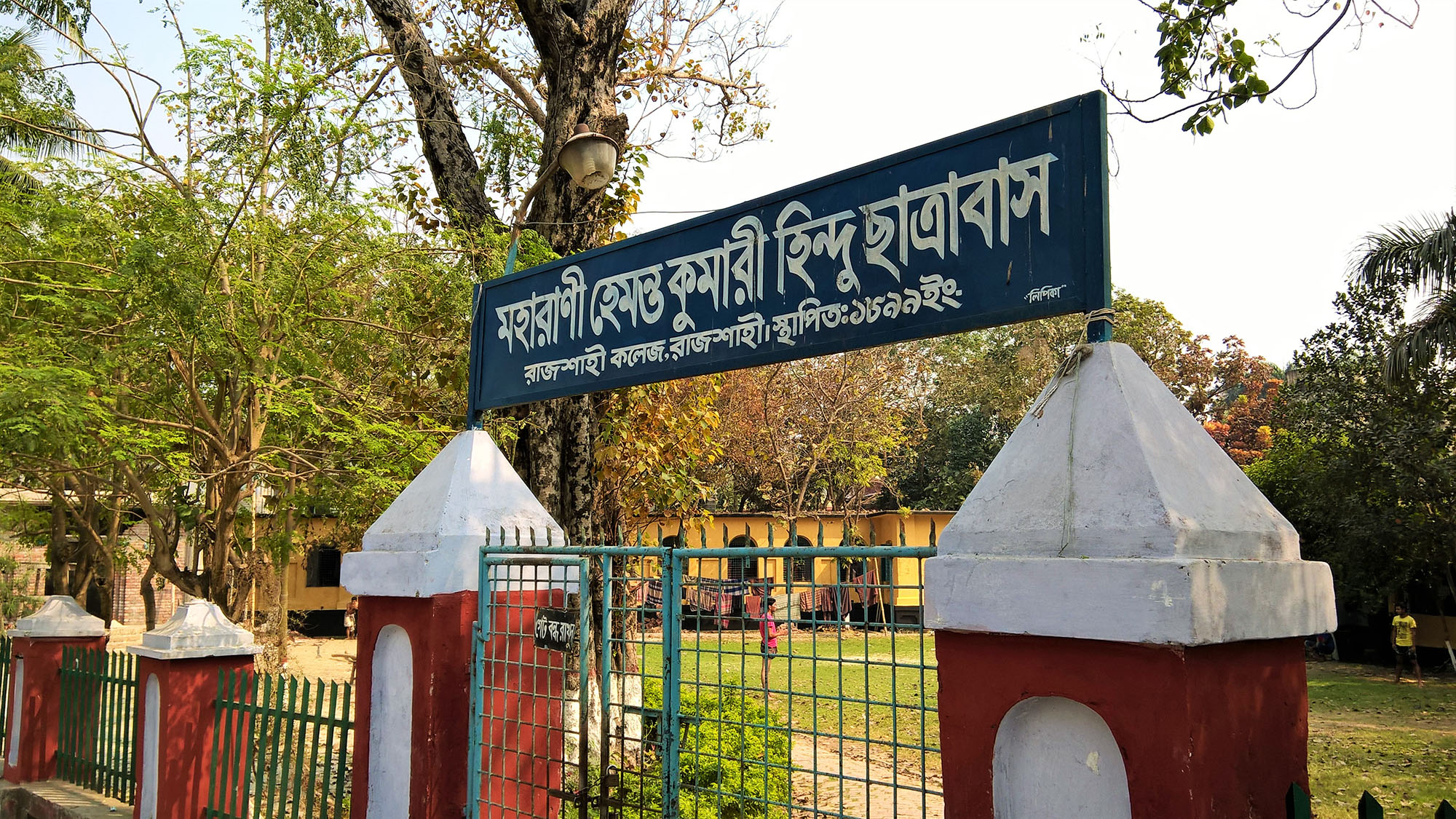
Maharani Hemanta Kumari Hindu Hostel, established in 1899, now used as one of the dormitories of Rajshahi College.

During Maharani Hemanta Kumari's zamindari tenure, many students, widows, and orphans received regular monthly allowances from her. She initiated and supported several educational and welfare activities in Rajshahi, including the construction of a hostel, now known as the Maharani Hemanta Kumari Hindu Hostel, under Rajshahi College. Her notable social welfare works include the Hemanta Kumari Water Works, Hemanta Kumari Sanskrit College, annual donations to the Naogaon Charity Hospital, assistance for the construction of bathing ghats at Bhagirathi, donations to the Deshbandhu Chittaranjan Memorial Fund, founding of the Maharani Hemanta Kumari Pilot High School and post office building in Nandina (Jamalpur, Mymensingh), and contributions to the orphanage at Puri Dham and Hemanta Nath Temple.

== See also ==
- Puthia Rajbari
- Rajshahi College
- Puthia Temple Complex
- Dhopkol
